

123001–123100 

|-bgcolor=#d6d6d6
| 123001 ||  || — || September 24, 2000 || Socorro || LINEAR || — || align=right | 4.5 km || 
|-id=002 bgcolor=#E9E9E9
| 123002 ||  || — || September 24, 2000 || Socorro || LINEAR || — || align=right | 1.8 km || 
|-id=003 bgcolor=#E9E9E9
| 123003 ||  || — || September 24, 2000 || Socorro || LINEAR || — || align=right | 1.7 km || 
|-id=004 bgcolor=#E9E9E9
| 123004 ||  || — || September 24, 2000 || Socorro || LINEAR || — || align=right | 4.7 km || 
|-id=005 bgcolor=#E9E9E9
| 123005 ||  || — || September 24, 2000 || Socorro || LINEAR || — || align=right | 2.3 km || 
|-id=006 bgcolor=#E9E9E9
| 123006 ||  || — || September 24, 2000 || Socorro || LINEAR || — || align=right | 2.4 km || 
|-id=007 bgcolor=#E9E9E9
| 123007 ||  || — || September 24, 2000 || Socorro || LINEAR || — || align=right | 3.5 km || 
|-id=008 bgcolor=#E9E9E9
| 123008 ||  || — || September 24, 2000 || Socorro || LINEAR || — || align=right | 2.0 km || 
|-id=009 bgcolor=#fefefe
| 123009 ||  || — || September 24, 2000 || Socorro || LINEAR || — || align=right | 1.7 km || 
|-id=010 bgcolor=#E9E9E9
| 123010 ||  || — || September 25, 2000 || Socorro || LINEAR || — || align=right | 3.2 km || 
|-id=011 bgcolor=#E9E9E9
| 123011 ||  || — || September 25, 2000 || Socorro || LINEAR || — || align=right | 4.2 km || 
|-id=012 bgcolor=#E9E9E9
| 123012 ||  || — || September 25, 2000 || Socorro || LINEAR || EUN || align=right | 3.2 km || 
|-id=013 bgcolor=#E9E9E9
| 123013 ||  || — || September 26, 2000 || Socorro || LINEAR || — || align=right | 1.8 km || 
|-id=014 bgcolor=#E9E9E9
| 123014 ||  || — || September 26, 2000 || Socorro || LINEAR || — || align=right | 2.6 km || 
|-id=015 bgcolor=#E9E9E9
| 123015 ||  || — || September 26, 2000 || Socorro || LINEAR || — || align=right | 2.9 km || 
|-id=016 bgcolor=#E9E9E9
| 123016 ||  || — || September 26, 2000 || Socorro || LINEAR || — || align=right | 4.3 km || 
|-id=017 bgcolor=#E9E9E9
| 123017 ||  || — || September 26, 2000 || Socorro || LINEAR || — || align=right | 2.2 km || 
|-id=018 bgcolor=#E9E9E9
| 123018 ||  || — || September 27, 2000 || Socorro || LINEAR || — || align=right | 2.0 km || 
|-id=019 bgcolor=#E9E9E9
| 123019 ||  || — || September 27, 2000 || Socorro || LINEAR || — || align=right | 2.8 km || 
|-id=020 bgcolor=#E9E9E9
| 123020 ||  || — || September 27, 2000 || Socorro || LINEAR || MRX || align=right | 2.0 km || 
|-id=021 bgcolor=#d6d6d6
| 123021 ||  || — || September 28, 2000 || Socorro || LINEAR || — || align=right | 4.2 km || 
|-id=022 bgcolor=#E9E9E9
| 123022 ||  || — || September 28, 2000 || Socorro || LINEAR || — || align=right | 3.4 km || 
|-id=023 bgcolor=#E9E9E9
| 123023 ||  || — || September 28, 2000 || Socorro || LINEAR || — || align=right | 5.2 km || 
|-id=024 bgcolor=#E9E9E9
| 123024 ||  || — || September 30, 2000 || Socorro || LINEAR || — || align=right | 3.6 km || 
|-id=025 bgcolor=#E9E9E9
| 123025 ||  || — || September 30, 2000 || Socorro || LINEAR || — || align=right | 4.3 km || 
|-id=026 bgcolor=#E9E9E9
| 123026 ||  || — || September 25, 2000 || Socorro || LINEAR || EUN || align=right | 2.3 km || 
|-id=027 bgcolor=#E9E9E9
| 123027 ||  || — || September 27, 2000 || Socorro || LINEAR || RAF || align=right | 2.5 km || 
|-id=028 bgcolor=#E9E9E9
| 123028 ||  || — || September 23, 2000 || Socorro || LINEAR || NEM || align=right | 3.6 km || 
|-id=029 bgcolor=#E9E9E9
| 123029 ||  || — || September 23, 2000 || Socorro || LINEAR || — || align=right | 3.2 km || 
|-id=030 bgcolor=#E9E9E9
| 123030 ||  || — || September 23, 2000 || Socorro || LINEAR || ADE || align=right | 3.0 km || 
|-id=031 bgcolor=#E9E9E9
| 123031 ||  || — || September 23, 2000 || Socorro || LINEAR || MIT || align=right | 4.1 km || 
|-id=032 bgcolor=#E9E9E9
| 123032 ||  || — || September 24, 2000 || Socorro || LINEAR || — || align=right | 2.9 km || 
|-id=033 bgcolor=#E9E9E9
| 123033 ||  || — || September 24, 2000 || Socorro || LINEAR || — || align=right | 2.8 km || 
|-id=034 bgcolor=#E9E9E9
| 123034 ||  || — || September 26, 2000 || Socorro || LINEAR || — || align=right | 5.3 km || 
|-id=035 bgcolor=#E9E9E9
| 123035 ||  || — || September 27, 2000 || Socorro || LINEAR || — || align=right | 2.5 km || 
|-id=036 bgcolor=#E9E9E9
| 123036 ||  || — || September 27, 2000 || Socorro || LINEAR || EUN || align=right | 1.9 km || 
|-id=037 bgcolor=#fefefe
| 123037 ||  || — || September 27, 2000 || Socorro || LINEAR || — || align=right | 2.0 km || 
|-id=038 bgcolor=#E9E9E9
| 123038 ||  || — || September 27, 2000 || Socorro || LINEAR || WIT || align=right | 2.0 km || 
|-id=039 bgcolor=#E9E9E9
| 123039 ||  || — || September 27, 2000 || Socorro || LINEAR || — || align=right | 2.8 km || 
|-id=040 bgcolor=#E9E9E9
| 123040 ||  || — || September 27, 2000 || Socorro || LINEAR || — || align=right | 1.6 km || 
|-id=041 bgcolor=#E9E9E9
| 123041 ||  || — || September 27, 2000 || Socorro || LINEAR || — || align=right | 2.6 km || 
|-id=042 bgcolor=#E9E9E9
| 123042 ||  || — || September 27, 2000 || Socorro || LINEAR || DOR || align=right | 4.7 km || 
|-id=043 bgcolor=#fefefe
| 123043 ||  || — || September 27, 2000 || Socorro || LINEAR || — || align=right | 1.8 km || 
|-id=044 bgcolor=#E9E9E9
| 123044 ||  || — || September 27, 2000 || Socorro || LINEAR || ADE || align=right | 3.4 km || 
|-id=045 bgcolor=#E9E9E9
| 123045 ||  || — || September 27, 2000 || Socorro || LINEAR || GEF || align=right | 2.4 km || 
|-id=046 bgcolor=#E9E9E9
| 123046 ||  || — || September 27, 2000 || Socorro || LINEAR || — || align=right | 2.6 km || 
|-id=047 bgcolor=#E9E9E9
| 123047 ||  || — || September 27, 2000 || Socorro || LINEAR || KRM || align=right | 4.6 km || 
|-id=048 bgcolor=#E9E9E9
| 123048 ||  || — || September 27, 2000 || Socorro || LINEAR || JUN || align=right | 1.8 km || 
|-id=049 bgcolor=#E9E9E9
| 123049 ||  || — || September 27, 2000 || Socorro || LINEAR || EUN || align=right | 2.8 km || 
|-id=050 bgcolor=#E9E9E9
| 123050 ||  || — || September 27, 2000 || Socorro || LINEAR || — || align=right | 3.1 km || 
|-id=051 bgcolor=#E9E9E9
| 123051 ||  || — || September 27, 2000 || Socorro || LINEAR || — || align=right | 2.5 km || 
|-id=052 bgcolor=#E9E9E9
| 123052 ||  || — || September 27, 2000 || Socorro || LINEAR || — || align=right | 4.5 km || 
|-id=053 bgcolor=#E9E9E9
| 123053 ||  || — || September 28, 2000 || Socorro || LINEAR || — || align=right | 3.8 km || 
|-id=054 bgcolor=#fefefe
| 123054 ||  || — || September 28, 2000 || Socorro || LINEAR || FLO || align=right | 1.7 km || 
|-id=055 bgcolor=#fefefe
| 123055 ||  || — || September 28, 2000 || Socorro || LINEAR || V || align=right | 1.4 km || 
|-id=056 bgcolor=#E9E9E9
| 123056 ||  || — || September 28, 2000 || Socorro || LINEAR || — || align=right | 4.1 km || 
|-id=057 bgcolor=#fefefe
| 123057 ||  || — || September 28, 2000 || Socorro || LINEAR || — || align=right | 2.4 km || 
|-id=058 bgcolor=#fefefe
| 123058 ||  || — || September 28, 2000 || Socorro || LINEAR || V || align=right | 1.6 km || 
|-id=059 bgcolor=#E9E9E9
| 123059 ||  || — || September 28, 2000 || Socorro || LINEAR || — || align=right | 2.3 km || 
|-id=060 bgcolor=#E9E9E9
| 123060 ||  || — || September 28, 2000 || Socorro || LINEAR || MRX || align=right | 1.9 km || 
|-id=061 bgcolor=#E9E9E9
| 123061 ||  || — || September 28, 2000 || Socorro || LINEAR || EUN || align=right | 2.2 km || 
|-id=062 bgcolor=#E9E9E9
| 123062 ||  || — || September 28, 2000 || Socorro || LINEAR || — || align=right | 2.1 km || 
|-id=063 bgcolor=#E9E9E9
| 123063 ||  || — || September 28, 2000 || Socorro || LINEAR || — || align=right | 3.5 km || 
|-id=064 bgcolor=#fefefe
| 123064 ||  || — || September 28, 2000 || Socorro || LINEAR || — || align=right | 1.7 km || 
|-id=065 bgcolor=#E9E9E9
| 123065 ||  || — || September 30, 2000 || Socorro || LINEAR || — || align=right | 2.6 km || 
|-id=066 bgcolor=#E9E9E9
| 123066 ||  || — || September 30, 2000 || Socorro || LINEAR || — || align=right | 2.1 km || 
|-id=067 bgcolor=#E9E9E9
| 123067 ||  || — || September 30, 2000 || Socorro || LINEAR || — || align=right | 1.6 km || 
|-id=068 bgcolor=#E9E9E9
| 123068 ||  || — || September 30, 2000 || Socorro || LINEAR || — || align=right | 3.6 km || 
|-id=069 bgcolor=#fefefe
| 123069 ||  || — || September 30, 2000 || Socorro || LINEAR || V || align=right | 1.7 km || 
|-id=070 bgcolor=#E9E9E9
| 123070 ||  || — || September 24, 2000 || Socorro || LINEAR || — || align=right | 3.2 km || 
|-id=071 bgcolor=#E9E9E9
| 123071 ||  || — || September 26, 2000 || Socorro || LINEAR || MAR || align=right | 3.6 km || 
|-id=072 bgcolor=#E9E9E9
| 123072 ||  || — || September 26, 2000 || Socorro || LINEAR || — || align=right | 3.7 km || 
|-id=073 bgcolor=#E9E9E9
| 123073 ||  || — || September 26, 2000 || Socorro || LINEAR || EUN || align=right | 3.0 km || 
|-id=074 bgcolor=#E9E9E9
| 123074 ||  || — || September 26, 2000 || Socorro || LINEAR || — || align=right | 3.9 km || 
|-id=075 bgcolor=#E9E9E9
| 123075 ||  || — || September 27, 2000 || Socorro || LINEAR || — || align=right | 2.7 km || 
|-id=076 bgcolor=#E9E9E9
| 123076 ||  || — || September 27, 2000 || Socorro || LINEAR || — || align=right | 2.6 km || 
|-id=077 bgcolor=#E9E9E9
| 123077 ||  || — || September 27, 2000 || Socorro || LINEAR || MAR || align=right | 2.5 km || 
|-id=078 bgcolor=#E9E9E9
| 123078 ||  || — || September 27, 2000 || Socorro || LINEAR || — || align=right | 3.3 km || 
|-id=079 bgcolor=#E9E9E9
| 123079 ||  || — || September 28, 2000 || Socorro || LINEAR || — || align=right | 2.9 km || 
|-id=080 bgcolor=#E9E9E9
| 123080 ||  || — || September 30, 2000 || Socorro || LINEAR || — || align=right | 2.9 km || 
|-id=081 bgcolor=#E9E9E9
| 123081 ||  || — || September 30, 2000 || Socorro || LINEAR || EUN || align=right | 2.3 km || 
|-id=082 bgcolor=#E9E9E9
| 123082 ||  || — || September 26, 2000 || Socorro || LINEAR || — || align=right | 2.9 km || 
|-id=083 bgcolor=#E9E9E9
| 123083 ||  || — || September 26, 2000 || Socorro || LINEAR || EUN || align=right | 3.2 km || 
|-id=084 bgcolor=#E9E9E9
| 123084 ||  || — || September 27, 2000 || Socorro || LINEAR || — || align=right | 3.4 km || 
|-id=085 bgcolor=#E9E9E9
| 123085 ||  || — || September 30, 2000 || Socorro || LINEAR || MRX || align=right | 2.1 km || 
|-id=086 bgcolor=#E9E9E9
| 123086 ||  || — || September 28, 2000 || Črni Vrh || Črni Vrh || — || align=right | 2.6 km || 
|-id=087 bgcolor=#fefefe
| 123087 ||  || — || September 30, 2000 || Socorro || LINEAR || — || align=right | 1.5 km || 
|-id=088 bgcolor=#d6d6d6
| 123088 ||  || — || September 30, 2000 || Socorro || LINEAR || — || align=right | 5.6 km || 
|-id=089 bgcolor=#E9E9E9
| 123089 ||  || — || September 30, 2000 || Kitt Peak || Spacewatch || — || align=right | 1.7 km || 
|-id=090 bgcolor=#E9E9E9
| 123090 ||  || — || September 30, 2000 || Kitt Peak || Spacewatch || MAR || align=right | 1.7 km || 
|-id=091 bgcolor=#fefefe
| 123091 ||  || — || September 27, 2000 || Kitt Peak || Spacewatch || MAS || align=right | 1.5 km || 
|-id=092 bgcolor=#E9E9E9
| 123092 ||  || — || September 26, 2000 || Haleakala || NEAT || BRU || align=right | 4.3 km || 
|-id=093 bgcolor=#E9E9E9
| 123093 ||  || — || September 26, 2000 || Haleakala || NEAT || — || align=right | 4.0 km || 
|-id=094 bgcolor=#fefefe
| 123094 ||  || — || September 26, 2000 || Haleakala || NEAT || — || align=right | 1.7 km || 
|-id=095 bgcolor=#fefefe
| 123095 ||  || — || September 26, 2000 || Haleakala || NEAT || — || align=right | 1.6 km || 
|-id=096 bgcolor=#fefefe
| 123096 ||  || — || September 25, 2000 || Kitt Peak || Spacewatch || — || align=right | 1.5 km || 
|-id=097 bgcolor=#fefefe
| 123097 ||  || — || September 24, 2000 || Socorro || LINEAR || PHO || align=right | 2.4 km || 
|-id=098 bgcolor=#E9E9E9
| 123098 ||  || — || September 24, 2000 || Socorro || LINEAR || — || align=right | 2.7 km || 
|-id=099 bgcolor=#E9E9E9
| 123099 ||  || — || September 24, 2000 || Socorro || LINEAR || — || align=right | 3.8 km || 
|-id=100 bgcolor=#E9E9E9
| 123100 ||  || — || September 24, 2000 || Socorro || LINEAR || — || align=right | 3.7 km || 
|}

123101–123200 

|-bgcolor=#d6d6d6
| 123101 ||  || — || September 29, 2000 || Xinglong || SCAP || — || align=right | 5.1 km || 
|-id=102 bgcolor=#E9E9E9
| 123102 ||  || — || September 20, 2000 || Socorro || LINEAR || — || align=right | 2.4 km || 
|-id=103 bgcolor=#E9E9E9
| 123103 ||  || — || September 25, 2000 || Socorro || LINEAR || — || align=right | 3.1 km || 
|-id=104 bgcolor=#E9E9E9
| 123104 ||  || — || September 30, 2000 || Anderson Mesa || LONEOS || slow || align=right | 3.9 km || 
|-id=105 bgcolor=#E9E9E9
| 123105 ||  || — || September 29, 2000 || Anderson Mesa || LONEOS || — || align=right | 2.1 km || 
|-id=106 bgcolor=#E9E9E9
| 123106 ||  || — || September 29, 2000 || Anderson Mesa || LONEOS || MIT || align=right | 2.9 km || 
|-id=107 bgcolor=#E9E9E9
| 123107 ||  || — || September 29, 2000 || Anderson Mesa || LONEOS || — || align=right | 2.8 km || 
|-id=108 bgcolor=#E9E9E9
| 123108 ||  || — || September 29, 2000 || Anderson Mesa || LONEOS || — || align=right | 2.9 km || 
|-id=109 bgcolor=#E9E9E9
| 123109 ||  || — || September 29, 2000 || Anderson Mesa || LONEOS || — || align=right | 2.2 km || 
|-id=110 bgcolor=#E9E9E9
| 123110 ||  || — || September 28, 2000 || Anderson Mesa || LONEOS || ADE || align=right | 3.4 km || 
|-id=111 bgcolor=#d6d6d6
| 123111 ||  || — || September 28, 2000 || Anderson Mesa || LONEOS || BRA || align=right | 2.4 km || 
|-id=112 bgcolor=#E9E9E9
| 123112 ||  || — || September 28, 2000 || Anderson Mesa || LONEOS || — || align=right | 4.1 km || 
|-id=113 bgcolor=#fefefe
| 123113 ||  || — || September 23, 2000 || Anderson Mesa || LONEOS || — || align=right | 2.0 km || 
|-id=114 bgcolor=#fefefe
| 123114 ||  || — || September 21, 2000 || Anderson Mesa || LONEOS || — || align=right | 1.4 km || 
|-id=115 bgcolor=#E9E9E9
| 123115 ||  || — || September 23, 2000 || Socorro || LINEAR || — || align=right | 2.4 km || 
|-id=116 bgcolor=#fefefe
| 123116 ||  || — || September 23, 2000 || Anderson Mesa || LONEOS || V || align=right | 1.2 km || 
|-id=117 bgcolor=#fefefe
| 123117 ||  || — || September 23, 2000 || Anderson Mesa || LONEOS || — || align=right | 1.9 km || 
|-id=118 bgcolor=#d6d6d6
| 123118 ||  || — || September 22, 2000 || Anderson Mesa || LONEOS || CHA || align=right | 3.7 km || 
|-id=119 bgcolor=#fefefe
| 123119 ||  || — || September 24, 2000 || Anderson Mesa || LONEOS || — || align=right | 1.9 km || 
|-id=120 bgcolor=#d6d6d6
| 123120 Peternewman ||  ||  || September 26, 2000 || Apache Point || SDSS || EOS || align=right | 3.8 km || 
|-id=121 bgcolor=#E9E9E9
| 123121 ||  || — || October 1, 2000 || Socorro || LINEAR || — || align=right | 1.6 km || 
|-id=122 bgcolor=#E9E9E9
| 123122 ||  || — || October 1, 2000 || Socorro || LINEAR || MRX || align=right | 1.8 km || 
|-id=123 bgcolor=#E9E9E9
| 123123 ||  || — || October 1, 2000 || Socorro || LINEAR || — || align=right | 3.2 km || 
|-id=124 bgcolor=#fefefe
| 123124 ||  || — || October 1, 2000 || Socorro || LINEAR || NYS || align=right | 1.5 km || 
|-id=125 bgcolor=#E9E9E9
| 123125 ||  || — || October 1, 2000 || Socorro || LINEAR || — || align=right | 1.4 km || 
|-id=126 bgcolor=#fefefe
| 123126 ||  || — || October 1, 2000 || Socorro || LINEAR || NYS || align=right | 1.5 km || 
|-id=127 bgcolor=#fefefe
| 123127 ||  || — || October 1, 2000 || Socorro || LINEAR || NYS || align=right | 2.6 km || 
|-id=128 bgcolor=#d6d6d6
| 123128 ||  || — || October 1, 2000 || Socorro || LINEAR || — || align=right | 4.2 km || 
|-id=129 bgcolor=#E9E9E9
| 123129 ||  || — || October 1, 2000 || Socorro || LINEAR || — || align=right | 3.7 km || 
|-id=130 bgcolor=#fefefe
| 123130 ||  || — || October 1, 2000 || Socorro || LINEAR || — || align=right | 1.9 km || 
|-id=131 bgcolor=#fefefe
| 123131 ||  || — || October 1, 2000 || Socorro || LINEAR || — || align=right | 1.3 km || 
|-id=132 bgcolor=#d6d6d6
| 123132 ||  || — || October 1, 2000 || Socorro || LINEAR || EOS || align=right | 4.1 km || 
|-id=133 bgcolor=#d6d6d6
| 123133 ||  || — || October 1, 2000 || Socorro || LINEAR || — || align=right | 3.3 km || 
|-id=134 bgcolor=#E9E9E9
| 123134 ||  || — || October 1, 2000 || Socorro || LINEAR || AGN || align=right | 2.2 km || 
|-id=135 bgcolor=#E9E9E9
| 123135 ||  || — || October 1, 2000 || Socorro || LINEAR || — || align=right | 3.1 km || 
|-id=136 bgcolor=#E9E9E9
| 123136 ||  || — || October 1, 2000 || Socorro || LINEAR || — || align=right | 1.4 km || 
|-id=137 bgcolor=#E9E9E9
| 123137 ||  || — || October 1, 2000 || Socorro || LINEAR || — || align=right | 2.5 km || 
|-id=138 bgcolor=#fefefe
| 123138 ||  || — || October 1, 2000 || Socorro || LINEAR || — || align=right | 2.2 km || 
|-id=139 bgcolor=#E9E9E9
| 123139 ||  || — || October 1, 2000 || Socorro || LINEAR || — || align=right | 2.8 km || 
|-id=140 bgcolor=#E9E9E9
| 123140 ||  || — || October 1, 2000 || Socorro || LINEAR || — || align=right | 1.9 km || 
|-id=141 bgcolor=#E9E9E9
| 123141 ||  || — || October 1, 2000 || Socorro || LINEAR || MIS || align=right | 3.1 km || 
|-id=142 bgcolor=#E9E9E9
| 123142 ||  || — || October 1, 2000 || Socorro || LINEAR || — || align=right | 4.4 km || 
|-id=143 bgcolor=#E9E9E9
| 123143 ||  || — || October 1, 2000 || Socorro || LINEAR || — || align=right | 1.9 km || 
|-id=144 bgcolor=#E9E9E9
| 123144 ||  || — || October 1, 2000 || Socorro || LINEAR || — || align=right | 2.0 km || 
|-id=145 bgcolor=#fefefe
| 123145 ||  || — || October 1, 2000 || Socorro || LINEAR || MAS || align=right | 1.0 km || 
|-id=146 bgcolor=#fefefe
| 123146 ||  || — || October 2, 2000 || Socorro || LINEAR || — || align=right | 1.6 km || 
|-id=147 bgcolor=#E9E9E9
| 123147 ||  || — || October 2, 2000 || Socorro || LINEAR || JUN || align=right | 1.8 km || 
|-id=148 bgcolor=#E9E9E9
| 123148 ||  || — || October 1, 2000 || Socorro || LINEAR || — || align=right | 3.7 km || 
|-id=149 bgcolor=#d6d6d6
| 123149 ||  || — || October 3, 2000 || Socorro || LINEAR || — || align=right | 8.9 km || 
|-id=150 bgcolor=#fefefe
| 123150 ||  || — || October 6, 2000 || Kitt Peak || Spacewatch || — || align=right | 1.6 km || 
|-id=151 bgcolor=#E9E9E9
| 123151 ||  || — || October 4, 2000 || Socorro || LINEAR || — || align=right | 7.3 km || 
|-id=152 bgcolor=#fefefe
| 123152 ||  || — || October 1, 2000 || Socorro || LINEAR || — || align=right | 1.8 km || 
|-id=153 bgcolor=#fefefe
| 123153 ||  || — || October 1, 2000 || Socorro || LINEAR || — || align=right | 1.5 km || 
|-id=154 bgcolor=#E9E9E9
| 123154 ||  || — || October 1, 2000 || Socorro || LINEAR || — || align=right | 2.8 km || 
|-id=155 bgcolor=#fefefe
| 123155 ||  || — || October 1, 2000 || Socorro || LINEAR || — || align=right | 2.2 km || 
|-id=156 bgcolor=#E9E9E9
| 123156 ||  || — || October 1, 2000 || Socorro || LINEAR || — || align=right | 1.5 km || 
|-id=157 bgcolor=#E9E9E9
| 123157 ||  || — || October 1, 2000 || Socorro || LINEAR || — || align=right | 4.5 km || 
|-id=158 bgcolor=#fefefe
| 123158 ||  || — || October 1, 2000 || Socorro || LINEAR || — || align=right | 1.6 km || 
|-id=159 bgcolor=#E9E9E9
| 123159 ||  || — || October 1, 2000 || Anderson Mesa || LONEOS || — || align=right | 1.3 km || 
|-id=160 bgcolor=#fefefe
| 123160 ||  || — || October 1, 2000 || Anderson Mesa || LONEOS || NYS || align=right | 1.4 km || 
|-id=161 bgcolor=#E9E9E9
| 123161 ||  || — || October 1, 2000 || Anderson Mesa || LONEOS || — || align=right | 1.6 km || 
|-id=162 bgcolor=#E9E9E9
| 123162 ||  || — || October 1, 2000 || Socorro || LINEAR || — || align=right | 4.1 km || 
|-id=163 bgcolor=#E9E9E9
| 123163 ||  || — || October 1, 2000 || Anderson Mesa || LONEOS || — || align=right | 2.0 km || 
|-id=164 bgcolor=#E9E9E9
| 123164 ||  || — || October 1, 2000 || Socorro || LINEAR || — || align=right | 4.6 km || 
|-id=165 bgcolor=#E9E9E9
| 123165 ||  || — || October 1, 2000 || Socorro || LINEAR || — || align=right | 6.2 km || 
|-id=166 bgcolor=#fefefe
| 123166 ||  || — || October 1, 2000 || Socorro || LINEAR || NYS || align=right | 1.4 km || 
|-id=167 bgcolor=#E9E9E9
| 123167 ||  || — || October 1, 2000 || Socorro || LINEAR || — || align=right | 1.5 km || 
|-id=168 bgcolor=#fefefe
| 123168 ||  || — || October 1, 2000 || Socorro || LINEAR || — || align=right | 1.4 km || 
|-id=169 bgcolor=#E9E9E9
| 123169 ||  || — || October 2, 2000 || Anderson Mesa || LONEOS || — || align=right | 4.4 km || 
|-id=170 bgcolor=#E9E9E9
| 123170 ||  || — || October 2, 2000 || Anderson Mesa || LONEOS || — || align=right | 4.8 km || 
|-id=171 bgcolor=#E9E9E9
| 123171 ||  || — || October 2, 2000 || Anderson Mesa || LONEOS || — || align=right | 4.5 km || 
|-id=172 bgcolor=#E9E9E9
| 123172 ||  || — || October 2, 2000 || Anderson Mesa || LONEOS || — || align=right | 2.7 km || 
|-id=173 bgcolor=#E9E9E9
| 123173 ||  || — || October 2, 2000 || Anderson Mesa || LONEOS || — || align=right | 2.6 km || 
|-id=174 bgcolor=#E9E9E9
| 123174 ||  || — || October 2, 2000 || Anderson Mesa || LONEOS || EUN || align=right | 2.5 km || 
|-id=175 bgcolor=#E9E9E9
| 123175 ||  || — || October 3, 2000 || Anderson Mesa || LONEOS || — || align=right | 3.1 km || 
|-id=176 bgcolor=#E9E9E9
| 123176 ||  || — || October 3, 2000 || Socorro || LINEAR || — || align=right | 3.6 km || 
|-id=177 bgcolor=#d6d6d6
| 123177 ||  || — || October 1, 2000 || Socorro || LINEAR || K-2 || align=right | 2.0 km || 
|-id=178 bgcolor=#E9E9E9
| 123178 ||  || — || October 2, 2000 || Socorro || LINEAR || — || align=right | 1.1 km || 
|-id=179 bgcolor=#E9E9E9
| 123179 ||  || — || October 2, 2000 || Socorro || LINEAR || BRU || align=right | 4.6 km || 
|-id=180 bgcolor=#E9E9E9
| 123180 ||  || — || October 6, 2000 || Haleakala || NEAT || — || align=right | 3.8 km || 
|-id=181 bgcolor=#E9E9E9
| 123181 ||  || — || October 22, 2000 || Bergisch Gladbach || W. Bickel || — || align=right | 2.4 km || 
|-id=182 bgcolor=#fefefe
| 123182 ||  || — || October 24, 2000 || Socorro || LINEAR || NYS || align=right | 1.2 km || 
|-id=183 bgcolor=#E9E9E9
| 123183 ||  || — || October 24, 2000 || Socorro || LINEAR || — || align=right | 3.0 km || 
|-id=184 bgcolor=#E9E9E9
| 123184 ||  || — || October 24, 2000 || Socorro || LINEAR || VIBslow || align=right | 5.0 km || 
|-id=185 bgcolor=#d6d6d6
| 123185 ||  || — || October 24, 2000 || Socorro || LINEAR || — || align=right | 4.6 km || 
|-id=186 bgcolor=#E9E9E9
| 123186 ||  || — || October 24, 2000 || Socorro || LINEAR || — || align=right | 4.1 km || 
|-id=187 bgcolor=#E9E9E9
| 123187 ||  || — || October 25, 2000 || Socorro || LINEAR || — || align=right | 2.7 km || 
|-id=188 bgcolor=#fefefe
| 123188 ||  || — || October 25, 2000 || Socorro || LINEAR || — || align=right | 1.7 km || 
|-id=189 bgcolor=#E9E9E9
| 123189 ||  || — || October 23, 2000 || Ondřejov || P. Kušnirák || — || align=right | 3.5 km || 
|-id=190 bgcolor=#E9E9E9
| 123190 ||  || — || October 24, 2000 || Socorro || LINEAR || — || align=right | 1.8 km || 
|-id=191 bgcolor=#E9E9E9
| 123191 ||  || — || October 25, 2000 || Socorro || LINEAR || HNA || align=right | 4.0 km || 
|-id=192 bgcolor=#E9E9E9
| 123192 ||  || — || October 25, 2000 || Socorro || LINEAR || — || align=right | 5.8 km || 
|-id=193 bgcolor=#E9E9E9
| 123193 ||  || — || October 25, 2000 || Socorro || LINEAR || — || align=right | 2.1 km || 
|-id=194 bgcolor=#d6d6d6
| 123194 ||  || — || October 27, 2000 || Kitt Peak || Spacewatch || KOR || align=right | 2.0 km || 
|-id=195 bgcolor=#E9E9E9
| 123195 ||  || — || October 25, 2000 || Socorro || LINEAR || ADE || align=right | 4.7 km || 
|-id=196 bgcolor=#E9E9E9
| 123196 ||  || — || October 29, 2000 || Socorro || LINEAR || EUN || align=right | 2.1 km || 
|-id=197 bgcolor=#E9E9E9
| 123197 ||  || — || October 24, 2000 || Socorro || LINEAR || — || align=right | 2.5 km || 
|-id=198 bgcolor=#E9E9E9
| 123198 ||  || — || October 24, 2000 || Socorro || LINEAR || — || align=right | 2.0 km || 
|-id=199 bgcolor=#E9E9E9
| 123199 ||  || — || October 24, 2000 || Socorro || LINEAR || EUN || align=right | 2.4 km || 
|-id=200 bgcolor=#E9E9E9
| 123200 ||  || — || October 24, 2000 || Socorro || LINEAR || — || align=right | 4.6 km || 
|}

123201–123300 

|-bgcolor=#E9E9E9
| 123201 ||  || — || October 24, 2000 || Socorro || LINEAR || — || align=right | 2.0 km || 
|-id=202 bgcolor=#E9E9E9
| 123202 ||  || — || October 24, 2000 || Socorro || LINEAR || — || align=right | 1.6 km || 
|-id=203 bgcolor=#E9E9E9
| 123203 ||  || — || October 25, 2000 || Socorro || LINEAR || — || align=right | 2.2 km || 
|-id=204 bgcolor=#E9E9E9
| 123204 ||  || — || October 25, 2000 || Socorro || LINEAR || — || align=right | 2.6 km || 
|-id=205 bgcolor=#E9E9E9
| 123205 ||  || — || October 25, 2000 || Socorro || LINEAR || — || align=right | 4.7 km || 
|-id=206 bgcolor=#E9E9E9
| 123206 ||  || — || October 25, 2000 || Socorro || LINEAR || — || align=right | 1.9 km || 
|-id=207 bgcolor=#E9E9E9
| 123207 ||  || — || October 25, 2000 || Socorro || LINEAR || — || align=right | 2.7 km || 
|-id=208 bgcolor=#E9E9E9
| 123208 ||  || — || October 24, 2000 || Socorro || LINEAR || BRU || align=right | 5.1 km || 
|-id=209 bgcolor=#E9E9E9
| 123209 ||  || — || October 29, 2000 || Kitt Peak || Spacewatch || — || align=right | 2.3 km || 
|-id=210 bgcolor=#fefefe
| 123210 ||  || — || October 24, 2000 || Socorro || LINEAR || NYS || align=right | 1.5 km || 
|-id=211 bgcolor=#E9E9E9
| 123211 ||  || — || October 24, 2000 || Socorro || LINEAR || — || align=right | 5.4 km || 
|-id=212 bgcolor=#E9E9E9
| 123212 ||  || — || October 24, 2000 || Socorro || LINEAR || — || align=right | 2.8 km || 
|-id=213 bgcolor=#E9E9E9
| 123213 ||  || — || October 24, 2000 || Socorro || LINEAR || — || align=right | 5.3 km || 
|-id=214 bgcolor=#d6d6d6
| 123214 ||  || — || October 24, 2000 || Socorro || LINEAR || — || align=right | 4.4 km || 
|-id=215 bgcolor=#E9E9E9
| 123215 ||  || — || October 24, 2000 || Socorro || LINEAR || — || align=right | 3.7 km || 
|-id=216 bgcolor=#E9E9E9
| 123216 ||  || — || October 24, 2000 || Socorro || LINEAR || — || align=right | 1.4 km || 
|-id=217 bgcolor=#E9E9E9
| 123217 ||  || — || October 24, 2000 || Socorro || LINEAR || — || align=right | 5.1 km || 
|-id=218 bgcolor=#E9E9E9
| 123218 ||  || — || October 24, 2000 || Socorro || LINEAR || — || align=right | 5.1 km || 
|-id=219 bgcolor=#E9E9E9
| 123219 ||  || — || October 24, 2000 || Socorro || LINEAR || — || align=right | 2.9 km || 
|-id=220 bgcolor=#d6d6d6
| 123220 ||  || — || October 24, 2000 || Socorro || LINEAR || — || align=right | 4.6 km || 
|-id=221 bgcolor=#E9E9E9
| 123221 ||  || — || October 24, 2000 || Socorro || LINEAR || — || align=right | 2.4 km || 
|-id=222 bgcolor=#d6d6d6
| 123222 ||  || — || October 24, 2000 || Socorro || LINEAR || EMA || align=right | 5.8 km || 
|-id=223 bgcolor=#E9E9E9
| 123223 ||  || — || October 24, 2000 || Socorro || LINEAR || — || align=right | 1.9 km || 
|-id=224 bgcolor=#E9E9E9
| 123224 ||  || — || October 24, 2000 || Socorro || LINEAR || — || align=right | 2.4 km || 
|-id=225 bgcolor=#fefefe
| 123225 ||  || — || October 24, 2000 || Socorro || LINEAR || — || align=right | 1.8 km || 
|-id=226 bgcolor=#fefefe
| 123226 ||  || — || October 24, 2000 || Socorro || LINEAR || NYS || align=right | 1.7 km || 
|-id=227 bgcolor=#fefefe
| 123227 ||  || — || October 24, 2000 || Socorro || LINEAR || — || align=right | 2.7 km || 
|-id=228 bgcolor=#fefefe
| 123228 ||  || — || October 24, 2000 || Socorro || LINEAR || — || align=right | 2.3 km || 
|-id=229 bgcolor=#E9E9E9
| 123229 ||  || — || October 24, 2000 || Socorro || LINEAR || AGN || align=right | 3.3 km || 
|-id=230 bgcolor=#E9E9E9
| 123230 ||  || — || October 24, 2000 || Socorro || LINEAR || — || align=right | 4.8 km || 
|-id=231 bgcolor=#E9E9E9
| 123231 ||  || — || October 24, 2000 || Socorro || LINEAR || — || align=right | 2.6 km || 
|-id=232 bgcolor=#E9E9E9
| 123232 ||  || — || October 25, 2000 || Socorro || LINEAR || GEF || align=right | 2.0 km || 
|-id=233 bgcolor=#E9E9E9
| 123233 ||  || — || October 25, 2000 || Socorro || LINEAR || — || align=right | 2.7 km || 
|-id=234 bgcolor=#E9E9E9
| 123234 ||  || — || October 25, 2000 || Socorro || LINEAR || — || align=right | 1.8 km || 
|-id=235 bgcolor=#E9E9E9
| 123235 ||  || — || October 25, 2000 || Socorro || LINEAR || HOF || align=right | 5.2 km || 
|-id=236 bgcolor=#E9E9E9
| 123236 ||  || — || October 25, 2000 || Socorro || LINEAR || — || align=right | 2.8 km || 
|-id=237 bgcolor=#E9E9E9
| 123237 ||  || — || October 25, 2000 || Socorro || LINEAR || — || align=right | 2.0 km || 
|-id=238 bgcolor=#E9E9E9
| 123238 ||  || — || October 25, 2000 || Socorro || LINEAR || — || align=right | 2.2 km || 
|-id=239 bgcolor=#E9E9E9
| 123239 ||  || — || October 25, 2000 || Socorro || LINEAR || MRX || align=right | 1.9 km || 
|-id=240 bgcolor=#fefefe
| 123240 ||  || — || October 25, 2000 || Socorro || LINEAR || — || align=right | 1.9 km || 
|-id=241 bgcolor=#E9E9E9
| 123241 ||  || — || October 25, 2000 || Socorro || LINEAR || — || align=right | 1.9 km || 
|-id=242 bgcolor=#E9E9E9
| 123242 ||  || — || October 25, 2000 || Socorro || LINEAR || — || align=right | 1.7 km || 
|-id=243 bgcolor=#E9E9E9
| 123243 ||  || — || October 25, 2000 || Socorro || LINEAR || — || align=right | 2.2 km || 
|-id=244 bgcolor=#E9E9E9
| 123244 ||  || — || October 25, 2000 || Socorro || LINEAR || NEM || align=right | 3.6 km || 
|-id=245 bgcolor=#fefefe
| 123245 ||  || — || October 25, 2000 || Socorro || LINEAR || V || align=right | 2.0 km || 
|-id=246 bgcolor=#E9E9E9
| 123246 ||  || — || October 25, 2000 || Socorro || LINEAR || — || align=right | 4.1 km || 
|-id=247 bgcolor=#E9E9E9
| 123247 ||  || — || October 25, 2000 || Socorro || LINEAR || INO || align=right | 2.3 km || 
|-id=248 bgcolor=#E9E9E9
| 123248 ||  || — || October 25, 2000 || Socorro || LINEAR || — || align=right | 3.8 km || 
|-id=249 bgcolor=#E9E9E9
| 123249 ||  || — || October 25, 2000 || Socorro || LINEAR || — || align=right | 1.8 km || 
|-id=250 bgcolor=#E9E9E9
| 123250 ||  || — || October 25, 2000 || Socorro || LINEAR || AGN || align=right | 2.4 km || 
|-id=251 bgcolor=#E9E9E9
| 123251 ||  || — || October 25, 2000 || Socorro || LINEAR || — || align=right | 3.0 km || 
|-id=252 bgcolor=#d6d6d6
| 123252 ||  || — || October 25, 2000 || Socorro || LINEAR || TEL || align=right | 3.0 km || 
|-id=253 bgcolor=#E9E9E9
| 123253 ||  || — || October 25, 2000 || Socorro || LINEAR || — || align=right | 4.5 km || 
|-id=254 bgcolor=#E9E9E9
| 123254 ||  || — || October 25, 2000 || Socorro || LINEAR || — || align=right | 2.1 km || 
|-id=255 bgcolor=#E9E9E9
| 123255 ||  || — || October 25, 2000 || Socorro || LINEAR || MAR || align=right | 2.2 km || 
|-id=256 bgcolor=#E9E9E9
| 123256 ||  || — || October 26, 2000 || Socorro || LINEAR || HEN || align=right | 2.7 km || 
|-id=257 bgcolor=#E9E9E9
| 123257 ||  || — || October 26, 2000 || Socorro || LINEAR || — || align=right | 2.5 km || 
|-id=258 bgcolor=#E9E9E9
| 123258 ||  || — || October 30, 2000 || Socorro || LINEAR || AGN || align=right | 1.9 km || 
|-id=259 bgcolor=#d6d6d6
| 123259 ||  || — || October 31, 2000 || Socorro || LINEAR || — || align=right | 4.2 km || 
|-id=260 bgcolor=#E9E9E9
| 123260 ||  || — || October 24, 2000 || Socorro || LINEAR || MIS || align=right | 3.6 km || 
|-id=261 bgcolor=#E9E9E9
| 123261 ||  || — || October 24, 2000 || Socorro || LINEAR || — || align=right | 1.9 km || 
|-id=262 bgcolor=#E9E9E9
| 123262 ||  || — || October 24, 2000 || Socorro || LINEAR || — || align=right | 4.1 km || 
|-id=263 bgcolor=#E9E9E9
| 123263 ||  || — || October 24, 2000 || Socorro || LINEAR || — || align=right | 3.0 km || 
|-id=264 bgcolor=#d6d6d6
| 123264 ||  || — || October 24, 2000 || Socorro || LINEAR || THM || align=right | 5.8 km || 
|-id=265 bgcolor=#E9E9E9
| 123265 ||  || — || October 24, 2000 || Socorro || LINEAR || EUN || align=right | 3.3 km || 
|-id=266 bgcolor=#E9E9E9
| 123266 ||  || — || October 25, 2000 || Socorro || LINEAR || HOF || align=right | 4.0 km || 
|-id=267 bgcolor=#E9E9E9
| 123267 ||  || — || October 26, 2000 || Socorro || LINEAR || — || align=right | 3.3 km || 
|-id=268 bgcolor=#E9E9E9
| 123268 ||  || — || October 29, 2000 || Socorro || LINEAR || — || align=right | 2.4 km || 
|-id=269 bgcolor=#E9E9E9
| 123269 ||  || — || October 31, 2000 || Socorro || LINEAR || — || align=right | 2.3 km || 
|-id=270 bgcolor=#E9E9E9
| 123270 ||  || — || October 31, 2000 || Socorro || LINEAR || — || align=right | 3.1 km || 
|-id=271 bgcolor=#E9E9E9
| 123271 ||  || — || October 31, 2000 || Socorro || LINEAR || — || align=right | 2.7 km || 
|-id=272 bgcolor=#E9E9E9
| 123272 ||  || — || October 31, 2000 || Socorro || LINEAR || — || align=right | 2.7 km || 
|-id=273 bgcolor=#E9E9E9
| 123273 ||  || — || October 24, 2000 || Socorro || LINEAR || MAR || align=right | 1.9 km || 
|-id=274 bgcolor=#E9E9E9
| 123274 ||  || — || October 25, 2000 || Socorro || LINEAR || HEN || align=right | 1.9 km || 
|-id=275 bgcolor=#fefefe
| 123275 ||  || — || October 25, 2000 || Socorro || LINEAR || — || align=right | 1.8 km || 
|-id=276 bgcolor=#d6d6d6
| 123276 ||  || — || October 25, 2000 || Socorro || LINEAR || EOS || align=right | 3.5 km || 
|-id=277 bgcolor=#E9E9E9
| 123277 ||  || — || October 25, 2000 || Socorro || LINEAR || — || align=right | 4.4 km || 
|-id=278 bgcolor=#E9E9E9
| 123278 ||  || — || October 25, 2000 || Socorro || LINEAR || — || align=right | 2.3 km || 
|-id=279 bgcolor=#E9E9E9
| 123279 ||  || — || October 25, 2000 || Socorro || LINEAR || — || align=right | 1.7 km || 
|-id=280 bgcolor=#E9E9E9
| 123280 ||  || — || October 25, 2000 || Socorro || LINEAR || — || align=right | 2.0 km || 
|-id=281 bgcolor=#E9E9E9
| 123281 ||  || — || October 25, 2000 || Socorro || LINEAR || — || align=right | 4.5 km || 
|-id=282 bgcolor=#E9E9E9
| 123282 ||  || — || October 25, 2000 || Socorro || LINEAR || GEF || align=right | 2.3 km || 
|-id=283 bgcolor=#E9E9E9
| 123283 ||  || — || October 25, 2000 || Socorro || LINEAR || — || align=right | 3.7 km || 
|-id=284 bgcolor=#E9E9E9
| 123284 ||  || — || October 25, 2000 || Socorro || LINEAR || — || align=right | 3.2 km || 
|-id=285 bgcolor=#fefefe
| 123285 ||  || — || October 25, 2000 || Socorro || LINEAR || — || align=right | 2.8 km || 
|-id=286 bgcolor=#E9E9E9
| 123286 ||  || — || October 25, 2000 || Socorro || LINEAR || — || align=right | 1.8 km || 
|-id=287 bgcolor=#E9E9E9
| 123287 ||  || — || October 25, 2000 || Socorro || LINEAR || — || align=right | 3.4 km || 
|-id=288 bgcolor=#fefefe
| 123288 ||  || — || October 25, 2000 || Socorro || LINEAR || — || align=right | 3.5 km || 
|-id=289 bgcolor=#E9E9E9
| 123289 ||  || — || October 25, 2000 || Socorro || LINEAR || — || align=right | 2.6 km || 
|-id=290 bgcolor=#E9E9E9
| 123290 Manoa ||  ||  || October 25, 2000 || Socorro || LINEAR || — || align=right | 3.0 km || 
|-id=291 bgcolor=#E9E9E9
| 123291 ||  || — || October 25, 2000 || Socorro || LINEAR || CLO || align=right | 4.7 km || 
|-id=292 bgcolor=#E9E9E9
| 123292 ||  || — || October 25, 2000 || Socorro || LINEAR || — || align=right | 3.5 km || 
|-id=293 bgcolor=#E9E9E9
| 123293 ||  || — || October 25, 2000 || Socorro || LINEAR || JUN || align=right | 2.6 km || 
|-id=294 bgcolor=#E9E9E9
| 123294 ||  || — || October 25, 2000 || Socorro || LINEAR || AGN || align=right | 2.1 km || 
|-id=295 bgcolor=#E9E9E9
| 123295 ||  || — || October 25, 2000 || Socorro || LINEAR || — || align=right | 3.1 km || 
|-id=296 bgcolor=#E9E9E9
| 123296 ||  || — || October 25, 2000 || Socorro || LINEAR || — || align=right | 3.7 km || 
|-id=297 bgcolor=#E9E9E9
| 123297 ||  || — || October 29, 2000 || Socorro || LINEAR || — || align=right | 2.3 km || 
|-id=298 bgcolor=#E9E9E9
| 123298 ||  || — || October 31, 2000 || Socorro || LINEAR || — || align=right | 2.7 km || 
|-id=299 bgcolor=#E9E9E9
| 123299 ||  || — || October 26, 2000 || Kitt Peak || Spacewatch || — || align=right | 2.5 km || 
|-id=300 bgcolor=#d6d6d6
| 123300 ||  || — || October 31, 2000 || Socorro || LINEAR || KOR || align=right | 2.4 km || 
|}

123301–123400 

|-bgcolor=#E9E9E9
| 123301 ||  || — || October 25, 2000 || Socorro || LINEAR || — || align=right | 2.7 km || 
|-id=302 bgcolor=#E9E9E9
| 123302 ||  || — || October 19, 2000 || McGraw-Hill || G. J. Garradd || — || align=right | 4.9 km || 
|-id=303 bgcolor=#E9E9E9
| 123303 || 2000 VT || — || November 1, 2000 || Kitt Peak || Spacewatch || — || align=right | 3.2 km || 
|-id=304 bgcolor=#fefefe
| 123304 ||  || — || November 1, 2000 || Socorro || LINEAR || H || align=right | 1.2 km || 
|-id=305 bgcolor=#fefefe
| 123305 ||  || — || November 1, 2000 || Socorro || LINEAR || H || align=right | 1.2 km || 
|-id=306 bgcolor=#E9E9E9
| 123306 ||  || — || November 2, 2000 || Kitt Peak || Spacewatch || — || align=right | 1.1 km || 
|-id=307 bgcolor=#E9E9E9
| 123307 ||  || — || November 1, 2000 || Socorro || LINEAR || — || align=right | 3.1 km || 
|-id=308 bgcolor=#fefefe
| 123308 ||  || — || November 1, 2000 || Socorro || LINEAR || — || align=right | 1.7 km || 
|-id=309 bgcolor=#d6d6d6
| 123309 ||  || — || November 1, 2000 || Socorro || LINEAR || — || align=right | 5.6 km || 
|-id=310 bgcolor=#E9E9E9
| 123310 ||  || — || November 1, 2000 || Socorro || LINEAR || — || align=right | 4.5 km || 
|-id=311 bgcolor=#d6d6d6
| 123311 ||  || — || November 1, 2000 || Socorro || LINEAR || — || align=right | 4.9 km || 
|-id=312 bgcolor=#fefefe
| 123312 ||  || — || November 1, 2000 || Socorro || LINEAR || — || align=right | 1.8 km || 
|-id=313 bgcolor=#E9E9E9
| 123313 ||  || — || November 1, 2000 || Socorro || LINEAR || — || align=right | 5.3 km || 
|-id=314 bgcolor=#d6d6d6
| 123314 ||  || — || November 1, 2000 || Socorro || LINEAR || — || align=right | 4.3 km || 
|-id=315 bgcolor=#E9E9E9
| 123315 ||  || — || November 1, 2000 || Socorro || LINEAR || — || align=right | 2.7 km || 
|-id=316 bgcolor=#E9E9E9
| 123316 ||  || — || November 1, 2000 || Socorro || LINEAR || HEN || align=right | 2.3 km || 
|-id=317 bgcolor=#E9E9E9
| 123317 ||  || — || November 1, 2000 || Socorro || LINEAR || MRX || align=right | 2.2 km || 
|-id=318 bgcolor=#E9E9E9
| 123318 ||  || — || November 1, 2000 || Socorro || LINEAR || — || align=right | 4.5 km || 
|-id=319 bgcolor=#E9E9E9
| 123319 ||  || — || November 1, 2000 || Socorro || LINEAR || — || align=right | 1.8 km || 
|-id=320 bgcolor=#fefefe
| 123320 ||  || — || November 1, 2000 || Socorro || LINEAR || NYS || align=right | 2.8 km || 
|-id=321 bgcolor=#E9E9E9
| 123321 ||  || — || November 1, 2000 || Socorro || LINEAR || — || align=right | 2.4 km || 
|-id=322 bgcolor=#E9E9E9
| 123322 ||  || — || November 1, 2000 || Socorro || LINEAR || — || align=right | 3.1 km || 
|-id=323 bgcolor=#E9E9E9
| 123323 ||  || — || November 1, 2000 || Socorro || LINEAR || — || align=right | 1.9 km || 
|-id=324 bgcolor=#E9E9E9
| 123324 ||  || — || November 1, 2000 || Socorro || LINEAR || — || align=right | 3.1 km || 
|-id=325 bgcolor=#E9E9E9
| 123325 ||  || — || November 1, 2000 || Socorro || LINEAR || — || align=right | 2.1 km || 
|-id=326 bgcolor=#E9E9E9
| 123326 ||  || — || November 1, 2000 || Socorro || LINEAR || — || align=right | 4.5 km || 
|-id=327 bgcolor=#E9E9E9
| 123327 ||  || — || November 1, 2000 || Socorro || LINEAR || MAR || align=right | 2.9 km || 
|-id=328 bgcolor=#E9E9E9
| 123328 ||  || — || November 1, 2000 || Socorro || LINEAR || — || align=right | 2.1 km || 
|-id=329 bgcolor=#E9E9E9
| 123329 ||  || — || November 1, 2000 || Socorro || LINEAR || ADE || align=right | 4.3 km || 
|-id=330 bgcolor=#E9E9E9
| 123330 ||  || — || November 1, 2000 || Socorro || LINEAR || — || align=right | 4.4 km || 
|-id=331 bgcolor=#E9E9E9
| 123331 ||  || — || November 1, 2000 || Socorro || LINEAR || — || align=right | 3.4 km || 
|-id=332 bgcolor=#E9E9E9
| 123332 ||  || — || November 1, 2000 || Socorro || LINEAR || — || align=right | 4.3 km || 
|-id=333 bgcolor=#E9E9E9
| 123333 ||  || — || November 1, 2000 || Socorro || LINEAR || — || align=right | 2.3 km || 
|-id=334 bgcolor=#E9E9E9
| 123334 ||  || — || November 1, 2000 || Socorro || LINEAR || — || align=right | 3.0 km || 
|-id=335 bgcolor=#E9E9E9
| 123335 ||  || — || November 1, 2000 || Socorro || LINEAR || — || align=right | 3.2 km || 
|-id=336 bgcolor=#E9E9E9
| 123336 ||  || — || November 1, 2000 || Socorro || LINEAR || — || align=right | 2.3 km || 
|-id=337 bgcolor=#E9E9E9
| 123337 ||  || — || November 3, 2000 || Socorro || LINEAR || JUN || align=right | 2.4 km || 
|-id=338 bgcolor=#E9E9E9
| 123338 ||  || — || November 1, 2000 || Socorro || LINEAR || — || align=right | 3.0 km || 
|-id=339 bgcolor=#E9E9E9
| 123339 ||  || — || November 3, 2000 || Socorro || LINEAR || — || align=right | 2.5 km || 
|-id=340 bgcolor=#E9E9E9
| 123340 ||  || — || November 3, 2000 || Socorro || LINEAR || — || align=right | 2.1 km || 
|-id=341 bgcolor=#E9E9E9
| 123341 ||  || — || November 3, 2000 || Socorro || LINEAR || NEM || align=right | 3.9 km || 
|-id=342 bgcolor=#E9E9E9
| 123342 ||  || — || November 3, 2000 || Socorro || LINEAR || PAE || align=right | 3.7 km || 
|-id=343 bgcolor=#d6d6d6
| 123343 ||  || — || November 3, 2000 || Socorro || LINEAR || EMA || align=right | 9.0 km || 
|-id=344 bgcolor=#E9E9E9
| 123344 ||  || — || November 3, 2000 || Socorro || LINEAR || — || align=right | 4.2 km || 
|-id=345 bgcolor=#E9E9E9
| 123345 ||  || — || November 1, 2000 || Socorro || LINEAR || EUN || align=right | 2.2 km || 
|-id=346 bgcolor=#E9E9E9
| 123346 ||  || — || November 1, 2000 || Socorro || LINEAR || — || align=right | 1.7 km || 
|-id=347 bgcolor=#d6d6d6
| 123347 ||  || — || November 1, 2000 || Kitt Peak || Spacewatch || — || align=right | 4.4 km || 
|-id=348 bgcolor=#d6d6d6
| 123348 ||  || — || November 1, 2000 || Kitt Peak || Spacewatch || THM || align=right | 3.7 km || 
|-id=349 bgcolor=#E9E9E9
| 123349 ||  || — || November 9, 2000 || Socorro || LINEAR || PAL || align=right | 3.7 km || 
|-id=350 bgcolor=#E9E9E9
| 123350 ||  || — || November 17, 2000 || Socorro || LINEAR || — || align=right | 3.0 km || 
|-id=351 bgcolor=#E9E9E9
| 123351 ||  || — || November 18, 2000 || Fountain Hills || C. W. Juels || — || align=right | 3.8 km || 
|-id=352 bgcolor=#E9E9E9
| 123352 ||  || — || November 19, 2000 || Socorro || LINEAR || EUN || align=right | 2.3 km || 
|-id=353 bgcolor=#fefefe
| 123353 ||  || — || November 19, 2000 || Socorro || LINEAR || — || align=right | 3.9 km || 
|-id=354 bgcolor=#E9E9E9
| 123354 ||  || — || November 19, 2000 || Socorro || LINEAR || — || align=right | 5.1 km || 
|-id=355 bgcolor=#fefefe
| 123355 ||  || — || November 18, 2000 || Bisei SG Center || BATTeRS || NYS || align=right | 1.3 km || 
|-id=356 bgcolor=#E9E9E9
| 123356 ||  || — || November 21, 2000 || Socorro || LINEAR || — || align=right | 3.2 km || 
|-id=357 bgcolor=#E9E9E9
| 123357 ||  || — || November 21, 2000 || Socorro || LINEAR || — || align=right | 6.0 km || 
|-id=358 bgcolor=#E9E9E9
| 123358 ||  || — || November 24, 2000 || Moriyama || Moriyama Obs. || — || align=right | 3.8 km || 
|-id=359 bgcolor=#E9E9E9
| 123359 ||  || — || November 20, 2000 || Socorro || LINEAR || CLO || align=right | 3.6 km || 
|-id=360 bgcolor=#E9E9E9
| 123360 ||  || — || November 25, 2000 || Socorro || LINEAR || — || align=right | 1.9 km || 
|-id=361 bgcolor=#E9E9E9
| 123361 ||  || — || November 23, 2000 || Haleakala || NEAT || JUN || align=right | 5.1 km || 
|-id=362 bgcolor=#E9E9E9
| 123362 ||  || — || November 23, 2000 || Haleakala || NEAT || — || align=right | 3.8 km || 
|-id=363 bgcolor=#E9E9E9
| 123363 ||  || — || November 20, 2000 || Socorro || LINEAR || — || align=right | 2.3 km || 
|-id=364 bgcolor=#d6d6d6
| 123364 ||  || — || November 20, 2000 || Socorro || LINEAR || — || align=right | 4.1 km || 
|-id=365 bgcolor=#E9E9E9
| 123365 ||  || — || November 20, 2000 || Socorro || LINEAR || — || align=right | 2.9 km || 
|-id=366 bgcolor=#E9E9E9
| 123366 ||  || — || November 20, 2000 || Socorro || LINEAR || EUN || align=right | 3.0 km || 
|-id=367 bgcolor=#E9E9E9
| 123367 ||  || — || November 20, 2000 || Socorro || LINEAR || — || align=right | 4.5 km || 
|-id=368 bgcolor=#d6d6d6
| 123368 ||  || — || November 20, 2000 || Socorro || LINEAR || — || align=right | 6.5 km || 
|-id=369 bgcolor=#E9E9E9
| 123369 ||  || — || November 20, 2000 || Socorro || LINEAR || — || align=right | 2.7 km || 
|-id=370 bgcolor=#E9E9E9
| 123370 ||  || — || November 20, 2000 || Socorro || LINEAR || MRX || align=right | 2.0 km || 
|-id=371 bgcolor=#E9E9E9
| 123371 ||  || — || November 20, 2000 || Socorro || LINEAR || MAR || align=right | 5.7 km || 
|-id=372 bgcolor=#E9E9E9
| 123372 ||  || — || November 20, 2000 || Socorro || LINEAR || — || align=right | 5.5 km || 
|-id=373 bgcolor=#E9E9E9
| 123373 ||  || — || November 20, 2000 || Socorro || LINEAR || — || align=right | 1.8 km || 
|-id=374 bgcolor=#E9E9E9
| 123374 ||  || — || November 21, 2000 || Socorro || LINEAR || — || align=right | 2.7 km || 
|-id=375 bgcolor=#d6d6d6
| 123375 ||  || — || November 21, 2000 || Socorro || LINEAR || KOR || align=right | 2.6 km || 
|-id=376 bgcolor=#d6d6d6
| 123376 ||  || — || November 21, 2000 || Socorro || LINEAR || — || align=right | 4.4 km || 
|-id=377 bgcolor=#E9E9E9
| 123377 ||  || — || November 21, 2000 || Socorro || LINEAR || — || align=right | 2.4 km || 
|-id=378 bgcolor=#E9E9E9
| 123378 ||  || — || November 27, 2000 || Kitt Peak || Spacewatch || — || align=right | 2.0 km || 
|-id=379 bgcolor=#d6d6d6
| 123379 ||  || — || November 27, 2000 || Kitt Peak || Spacewatch || — || align=right | 3.5 km || 
|-id=380 bgcolor=#fefefe
| 123380 ||  || — || November 27, 2000 || Kitt Peak || Spacewatch || NYS || align=right | 1.3 km || 
|-id=381 bgcolor=#E9E9E9
| 123381 ||  || — || November 21, 2000 || Socorro || LINEAR || — || align=right | 3.3 km || 
|-id=382 bgcolor=#E9E9E9
| 123382 ||  || — || November 21, 2000 || Socorro || LINEAR || — || align=right | 3.2 km || 
|-id=383 bgcolor=#E9E9E9
| 123383 ||  || — || November 21, 2000 || Socorro || LINEAR || — || align=right | 4.3 km || 
|-id=384 bgcolor=#E9E9E9
| 123384 ||  || — || November 21, 2000 || Socorro || LINEAR || GEF || align=right | 2.5 km || 
|-id=385 bgcolor=#fefefe
| 123385 ||  || — || November 28, 2000 || Višnjan Observatory || K. Korlević || H || align=right | 1.4 km || 
|-id=386 bgcolor=#d6d6d6
| 123386 ||  || — || November 28, 2000 || Fountain Hills || C. W. Juels || 627 || align=right | 6.9 km || 
|-id=387 bgcolor=#E9E9E9
| 123387 ||  || — || November 20, 2000 || Socorro || LINEAR || GER || align=right | 4.7 km || 
|-id=388 bgcolor=#E9E9E9
| 123388 ||  || — || November 19, 2000 || Socorro || LINEAR || — || align=right | 4.7 km || 
|-id=389 bgcolor=#E9E9E9
| 123389 ||  || — || November 19, 2000 || Socorro || LINEAR || — || align=right | 4.8 km || 
|-id=390 bgcolor=#fefefe
| 123390 ||  || — || November 19, 2000 || Socorro || LINEAR || — || align=right | 1.9 km || 
|-id=391 bgcolor=#E9E9E9
| 123391 ||  || — || November 19, 2000 || Socorro || LINEAR || — || align=right | 2.3 km || 
|-id=392 bgcolor=#d6d6d6
| 123392 ||  || — || November 19, 2000 || Socorro || LINEAR || — || align=right | 3.1 km || 
|-id=393 bgcolor=#E9E9E9
| 123393 ||  || — || November 19, 2000 || Socorro || LINEAR || — || align=right | 5.3 km || 
|-id=394 bgcolor=#E9E9E9
| 123394 ||  || — || November 20, 2000 || Socorro || LINEAR || — || align=right | 2.4 km || 
|-id=395 bgcolor=#E9E9E9
| 123395 ||  || — || November 20, 2000 || Socorro || LINEAR || — || align=right | 2.8 km || 
|-id=396 bgcolor=#d6d6d6
| 123396 ||  || — || November 20, 2000 || Socorro || LINEAR || ITH || align=right | 3.1 km || 
|-id=397 bgcolor=#E9E9E9
| 123397 ||  || — || November 20, 2000 || Socorro || LINEAR || — || align=right | 2.1 km || 
|-id=398 bgcolor=#E9E9E9
| 123398 ||  || — || November 20, 2000 || Socorro || LINEAR || — || align=right | 2.2 km || 
|-id=399 bgcolor=#E9E9E9
| 123399 ||  || — || November 20, 2000 || Socorro || LINEAR || — || align=right | 1.9 km || 
|-id=400 bgcolor=#E9E9E9
| 123400 ||  || — || November 20, 2000 || Socorro || LINEAR || — || align=right | 3.8 km || 
|}

123401–123500 

|-bgcolor=#E9E9E9
| 123401 ||  || — || November 20, 2000 || Socorro || LINEAR || — || align=right | 2.9 km || 
|-id=402 bgcolor=#E9E9E9
| 123402 ||  || — || November 20, 2000 || Socorro || LINEAR || WIT || align=right | 2.0 km || 
|-id=403 bgcolor=#E9E9E9
| 123403 ||  || — || November 20, 2000 || Socorro || LINEAR || HEN || align=right | 2.3 km || 
|-id=404 bgcolor=#E9E9E9
| 123404 ||  || — || November 20, 2000 || Socorro || LINEAR || — || align=right | 2.7 km || 
|-id=405 bgcolor=#E9E9E9
| 123405 ||  || — || November 21, 2000 || Socorro || LINEAR || — || align=right | 3.9 km || 
|-id=406 bgcolor=#E9E9E9
| 123406 ||  || — || November 21, 2000 || Socorro || LINEAR || — || align=right | 2.6 km || 
|-id=407 bgcolor=#E9E9E9
| 123407 ||  || — || November 21, 2000 || Socorro || LINEAR || — || align=right | 4.5 km || 
|-id=408 bgcolor=#d6d6d6
| 123408 ||  || — || November 21, 2000 || Socorro || LINEAR || — || align=right | 4.9 km || 
|-id=409 bgcolor=#d6d6d6
| 123409 ||  || — || November 21, 2000 || Socorro || LINEAR || — || align=right | 7.5 km || 
|-id=410 bgcolor=#E9E9E9
| 123410 ||  || — || November 21, 2000 || Socorro || LINEAR || DOR || align=right | 6.5 km || 
|-id=411 bgcolor=#d6d6d6
| 123411 ||  || — || November 21, 2000 || Socorro || LINEAR || — || align=right | 5.9 km || 
|-id=412 bgcolor=#E9E9E9
| 123412 ||  || — || November 21, 2000 || Socorro || LINEAR || — || align=right | 2.0 km || 
|-id=413 bgcolor=#E9E9E9
| 123413 ||  || — || November 21, 2000 || Socorro || LINEAR || — || align=right | 2.6 km || 
|-id=414 bgcolor=#d6d6d6
| 123414 ||  || — || November 21, 2000 || Socorro || LINEAR || — || align=right | 5.2 km || 
|-id=415 bgcolor=#E9E9E9
| 123415 ||  || — || November 21, 2000 || Socorro || LINEAR || NEM || align=right | 4.2 km || 
|-id=416 bgcolor=#E9E9E9
| 123416 ||  || — || November 21, 2000 || Socorro || LINEAR || — || align=right | 2.3 km || 
|-id=417 bgcolor=#E9E9E9
| 123417 ||  || — || November 26, 2000 || Socorro || LINEAR || RAF || align=right | 1.5 km || 
|-id=418 bgcolor=#E9E9E9
| 123418 ||  || — || November 27, 2000 || Socorro || LINEAR || — || align=right | 2.4 km || 
|-id=419 bgcolor=#E9E9E9
| 123419 ||  || — || November 27, 2000 || Socorro || LINEAR || — || align=right | 3.7 km || 
|-id=420 bgcolor=#E9E9E9
| 123420 ||  || — || November 28, 2000 || Kitt Peak || Spacewatch || — || align=right | 1.9 km || 
|-id=421 bgcolor=#E9E9E9
| 123421 ||  || — || November 29, 2000 || Kitt Peak || Spacewatch || DOR || align=right | 4.5 km || 
|-id=422 bgcolor=#E9E9E9
| 123422 ||  || — || November 29, 2000 || Kitt Peak || Spacewatch || — || align=right | 1.7 km || 
|-id=423 bgcolor=#E9E9E9
| 123423 ||  || — || November 20, 2000 || Socorro || LINEAR || GEF || align=right | 2.6 km || 
|-id=424 bgcolor=#E9E9E9
| 123424 ||  || — || November 20, 2000 || Socorro || LINEAR || RAF || align=right | 1.9 km || 
|-id=425 bgcolor=#E9E9E9
| 123425 ||  || — || November 20, 2000 || Socorro || LINEAR || — || align=right | 2.6 km || 
|-id=426 bgcolor=#E9E9E9
| 123426 ||  || — || November 20, 2000 || Socorro || LINEAR || — || align=right | 2.6 km || 
|-id=427 bgcolor=#E9E9E9
| 123427 ||  || — || November 20, 2000 || Socorro || LINEAR || — || align=right | 4.3 km || 
|-id=428 bgcolor=#E9E9E9
| 123428 ||  || — || November 20, 2000 || Socorro || LINEAR || — || align=right | 1.9 km || 
|-id=429 bgcolor=#E9E9E9
| 123429 ||  || — || November 20, 2000 || Socorro || LINEAR || — || align=right | 2.2 km || 
|-id=430 bgcolor=#E9E9E9
| 123430 ||  || — || November 20, 2000 || Socorro || LINEAR || MRX || align=right | 2.6 km || 
|-id=431 bgcolor=#E9E9E9
| 123431 ||  || — || November 20, 2000 || Socorro || LINEAR || — || align=right | 2.4 km || 
|-id=432 bgcolor=#d6d6d6
| 123432 ||  || — || November 20, 2000 || Socorro || LINEAR || EOS || align=right | 4.5 km || 
|-id=433 bgcolor=#E9E9E9
| 123433 ||  || — || November 20, 2000 || Socorro || LINEAR || — || align=right | 2.8 km || 
|-id=434 bgcolor=#E9E9E9
| 123434 ||  || — || November 20, 2000 || Socorro || LINEAR || EUN || align=right | 3.0 km || 
|-id=435 bgcolor=#d6d6d6
| 123435 ||  || — || November 20, 2000 || Socorro || LINEAR || — || align=right | 4.6 km || 
|-id=436 bgcolor=#E9E9E9
| 123436 ||  || — || November 20, 2000 || Socorro || LINEAR || — || align=right | 3.9 km || 
|-id=437 bgcolor=#E9E9E9
| 123437 ||  || — || November 26, 2000 || Socorro || LINEAR || WAT || align=right | 4.3 km || 
|-id=438 bgcolor=#E9E9E9
| 123438 ||  || — || November 29, 2000 || Socorro || LINEAR || — || align=right | 3.2 km || 
|-id=439 bgcolor=#E9E9E9
| 123439 ||  || — || November 30, 2000 || Socorro || LINEAR || JUN || align=right | 2.1 km || 
|-id=440 bgcolor=#E9E9E9
| 123440 ||  || — || November 30, 2000 || Socorro || LINEAR || — || align=right | 3.0 km || 
|-id=441 bgcolor=#E9E9E9
| 123441 ||  || — || November 16, 2000 || Kitt Peak || Spacewatch || HEN || align=right | 1.6 km || 
|-id=442 bgcolor=#E9E9E9
| 123442 ||  || — || November 19, 2000 || Kitt Peak || Spacewatch || — || align=right | 2.2 km || 
|-id=443 bgcolor=#d6d6d6
| 123443 ||  || — || November 19, 2000 || Socorro || LINEAR || — || align=right | 5.3 km || 
|-id=444 bgcolor=#d6d6d6
| 123444 ||  || — || November 20, 2000 || Anderson Mesa || LONEOS || — || align=right | 3.6 km || 
|-id=445 bgcolor=#E9E9E9
| 123445 ||  || — || November 20, 2000 || Anderson Mesa || LONEOS || — || align=right | 2.4 km || 
|-id=446 bgcolor=#d6d6d6
| 123446 ||  || — || November 20, 2000 || Anderson Mesa || LONEOS || — || align=right | 3.0 km || 
|-id=447 bgcolor=#d6d6d6
| 123447 ||  || — || November 17, 2000 || Kitt Peak || Spacewatch || KOR || align=right | 2.6 km || 
|-id=448 bgcolor=#E9E9E9
| 123448 ||  || — || November 19, 2000 || Socorro || LINEAR || — || align=right | 2.2 km || 
|-id=449 bgcolor=#fefefe
| 123449 ||  || — || November 19, 2000 || Socorro || LINEAR || V || align=right | 1.6 km || 
|-id=450 bgcolor=#E9E9E9
| 123450 ||  || — || November 19, 2000 || Socorro || LINEAR || BRG || align=right | 4.0 km || 
|-id=451 bgcolor=#d6d6d6
| 123451 ||  || — || November 19, 2000 || Socorro || LINEAR || — || align=right | 3.8 km || 
|-id=452 bgcolor=#E9E9E9
| 123452 ||  || — || November 19, 2000 || Socorro || LINEAR || EUN || align=right | 2.3 km || 
|-id=453 bgcolor=#E9E9E9
| 123453 ||  || — || November 19, 2000 || Socorro || LINEAR || — || align=right | 5.0 km || 
|-id=454 bgcolor=#E9E9E9
| 123454 ||  || — || November 20, 2000 || Anderson Mesa || LONEOS || EUN || align=right | 2.2 km || 
|-id=455 bgcolor=#E9E9E9
| 123455 ||  || — || November 20, 2000 || Socorro || LINEAR || — || align=right | 2.0 km || 
|-id=456 bgcolor=#E9E9E9
| 123456 ||  || — || November 20, 2000 || Socorro || LINEAR || — || align=right | 5.3 km || 
|-id=457 bgcolor=#E9E9E9
| 123457 ||  || — || November 21, 2000 || Socorro || LINEAR || — || align=right | 3.8 km || 
|-id=458 bgcolor=#E9E9E9
| 123458 ||  || — || November 21, 2000 || Socorro || LINEAR || DOR || align=right | 4.3 km || 
|-id=459 bgcolor=#E9E9E9
| 123459 ||  || — || November 21, 2000 || Socorro || LINEAR || XIZ || align=right | 2.7 km || 
|-id=460 bgcolor=#E9E9E9
| 123460 ||  || — || November 19, 2000 || Socorro || LINEAR || — || align=right | 7.3 km || 
|-id=461 bgcolor=#E9E9E9
| 123461 ||  || — || November 20, 2000 || Anderson Mesa || LONEOS || — || align=right | 2.8 km || 
|-id=462 bgcolor=#E9E9E9
| 123462 ||  || — || November 20, 2000 || Anderson Mesa || LONEOS || EUN || align=right | 2.6 km || 
|-id=463 bgcolor=#E9E9E9
| 123463 ||  || — || November 20, 2000 || Anderson Mesa || LONEOS || — || align=right | 2.5 km || 
|-id=464 bgcolor=#E9E9E9
| 123464 ||  || — || November 21, 2000 || Socorro || LINEAR || — || align=right | 1.5 km || 
|-id=465 bgcolor=#E9E9E9
| 123465 ||  || — || November 22, 2000 || Haleakala || NEAT || — || align=right | 4.3 km || 
|-id=466 bgcolor=#E9E9E9
| 123466 ||  || — || November 23, 2000 || Haleakala || NEAT || — || align=right | 4.7 km || 
|-id=467 bgcolor=#E9E9E9
| 123467 ||  || — || November 28, 2000 || Haleakala || NEAT || — || align=right | 6.1 km || 
|-id=468 bgcolor=#d6d6d6
| 123468 ||  || — || November 28, 2000 || Kitt Peak || Spacewatch || THM || align=right | 4.7 km || 
|-id=469 bgcolor=#d6d6d6
| 123469 ||  || — || November 28, 2000 || Kitt Peak || Spacewatch || URS || align=right | 9.3 km || 
|-id=470 bgcolor=#E9E9E9
| 123470 ||  || — || November 28, 2000 || Haleakala || NEAT || — || align=right | 3.2 km || 
|-id=471 bgcolor=#E9E9E9
| 123471 ||  || — || November 29, 2000 || Haleakala || NEAT || GEF || align=right | 2.8 km || 
|-id=472 bgcolor=#E9E9E9
| 123472 ||  || — || November 30, 2000 || Socorro || LINEAR || — || align=right | 2.1 km || 
|-id=473 bgcolor=#E9E9E9
| 123473 ||  || — || November 30, 2000 || Socorro || LINEAR || — || align=right | 2.1 km || 
|-id=474 bgcolor=#E9E9E9
| 123474 ||  || — || November 30, 2000 || Socorro || LINEAR || — || align=right | 2.9 km || 
|-id=475 bgcolor=#E9E9E9
| 123475 ||  || — || November 30, 2000 || Socorro || LINEAR || — || align=right | 4.7 km || 
|-id=476 bgcolor=#E9E9E9
| 123476 ||  || — || November 30, 2000 || Socorro || LINEAR || — || align=right | 6.9 km || 
|-id=477 bgcolor=#E9E9E9
| 123477 ||  || — || November 20, 2000 || Anderson Mesa || LONEOS || JUN || align=right | 2.9 km || 
|-id=478 bgcolor=#d6d6d6
| 123478 ||  || — || November 20, 2000 || Anderson Mesa || LONEOS || — || align=right | 8.2 km || 
|-id=479 bgcolor=#E9E9E9
| 123479 ||  || — || November 20, 2000 || Anderson Mesa || LONEOS || GER || align=right | 5.2 km || 
|-id=480 bgcolor=#E9E9E9
| 123480 ||  || — || November 20, 2000 || Anderson Mesa || LONEOS || — || align=right | 4.1 km || 
|-id=481 bgcolor=#E9E9E9
| 123481 ||  || — || November 20, 2000 || Anderson Mesa || LONEOS || — || align=right | 2.1 km || 
|-id=482 bgcolor=#E9E9E9
| 123482 ||  || — || November 21, 2000 || Socorro || LINEAR || HEN || align=right | 2.4 km || 
|-id=483 bgcolor=#E9E9E9
| 123483 ||  || — || November 22, 2000 || Haleakala || NEAT || — || align=right | 3.1 km || 
|-id=484 bgcolor=#E9E9E9
| 123484 ||  || — || November 24, 2000 || Anderson Mesa || LONEOS || — || align=right | 2.1 km || 
|-id=485 bgcolor=#E9E9E9
| 123485 ||  || — || November 24, 2000 || Anderson Mesa || LONEOS || — || align=right | 2.7 km || 
|-id=486 bgcolor=#d6d6d6
| 123486 ||  || — || November 24, 2000 || Anderson Mesa || LONEOS || — || align=right | 5.9 km || 
|-id=487 bgcolor=#E9E9E9
| 123487 ||  || — || November 24, 2000 || Anderson Mesa || LONEOS || — || align=right | 3.3 km || 
|-id=488 bgcolor=#E9E9E9
| 123488 ||  || — || November 24, 2000 || Anderson Mesa || LONEOS || — || align=right | 2.2 km || 
|-id=489 bgcolor=#E9E9E9
| 123489 ||  || — || November 24, 2000 || Anderson Mesa || LONEOS || — || align=right | 2.0 km || 
|-id=490 bgcolor=#E9E9E9
| 123490 ||  || — || November 24, 2000 || Anderson Mesa || LONEOS || HEN || align=right | 2.2 km || 
|-id=491 bgcolor=#d6d6d6
| 123491 ||  || — || November 24, 2000 || Anderson Mesa || LONEOS || — || align=right | 4.7 km || 
|-id=492 bgcolor=#E9E9E9
| 123492 ||  || — || November 25, 2000 || Socorro || LINEAR || — || align=right | 4.7 km || 
|-id=493 bgcolor=#E9E9E9
| 123493 ||  || — || November 25, 2000 || Socorro || LINEAR || — || align=right | 2.5 km || 
|-id=494 bgcolor=#E9E9E9
| 123494 ||  || — || November 25, 2000 || Anderson Mesa || LONEOS || DOR || align=right | 6.3 km || 
|-id=495 bgcolor=#d6d6d6
| 123495 ||  || — || November 25, 2000 || Anderson Mesa || LONEOS || — || align=right | 6.6 km || 
|-id=496 bgcolor=#E9E9E9
| 123496 ||  || — || November 26, 2000 || Socorro || LINEAR || — || align=right | 7.5 km || 
|-id=497 bgcolor=#d6d6d6
| 123497 ||  || — || November 26, 2000 || Socorro || LINEAR || TRP || align=right | 8.8 km || 
|-id=498 bgcolor=#E9E9E9
| 123498 ||  || — || November 29, 2000 || Socorro || LINEAR || — || align=right | 1.8 km || 
|-id=499 bgcolor=#d6d6d6
| 123499 ||  || — || November 30, 2000 || Gnosca || S. Sposetti || — || align=right | 4.7 km || 
|-id=500 bgcolor=#fefefe
| 123500 ||  || — || November 27, 2000 || Socorro || LINEAR || NYS || align=right | 1.1 km || 
|}

123501–123600 

|-bgcolor=#E9E9E9
| 123501 ||  || — || November 27, 2000 || Socorro || LINEAR || — || align=right | 2.3 km || 
|-id=502 bgcolor=#E9E9E9
| 123502 ||  || — || November 29, 2000 || Socorro || LINEAR || — || align=right | 5.5 km || 
|-id=503 bgcolor=#E9E9E9
| 123503 ||  || — || November 29, 2000 || Socorro || LINEAR || — || align=right | 1.6 km || 
|-id=504 bgcolor=#d6d6d6
| 123504 ||  || — || November 29, 2000 || Socorro || LINEAR || ITH || align=right | 2.6 km || 
|-id=505 bgcolor=#fefefe
| 123505 ||  || — || November 30, 2000 || Anderson Mesa || LONEOS || NYS || align=right | 1.3 km || 
|-id=506 bgcolor=#d6d6d6
| 123506 ||  || — || November 25, 2000 || Socorro || LINEAR || — || align=right | 5.0 km || 
|-id=507 bgcolor=#E9E9E9
| 123507 ||  || — || November 20, 2000 || Anderson Mesa || LONEOS || INO || align=right | 2.6 km || 
|-id=508 bgcolor=#E9E9E9
| 123508 ||  || — || November 18, 2000 || Socorro || LINEAR || EUN || align=right | 2.5 km || 
|-id=509 bgcolor=#C2E0FF
| 123509 ||  || — || November 26, 2000 || La Silla || O. R. Hainaut, C. E. Delahodde, A. C. Delsanti || cubewano (cold)mooncritical || align=right | 222 km || 
|-id=510 bgcolor=#E9E9E9
| 123510 ||  || — || November 29, 2000 || Anderson Mesa || LONEOS || — || align=right | 2.8 km || 
|-id=511 bgcolor=#E9E9E9
| 123511 ||  || — || November 29, 2000 || Socorro || LINEAR || MRX || align=right | 2.1 km || 
|-id=512 bgcolor=#E9E9E9
| 123512 ||  || — || November 16, 2000 || Anderson Mesa || LONEOS || MAR || align=right | 2.9 km || 
|-id=513 bgcolor=#E9E9E9
| 123513 ||  || — || November 18, 2000 || Anderson Mesa || LONEOS || — || align=right | 1.6 km || 
|-id=514 bgcolor=#E9E9E9
| 123514 ||  || — || November 19, 2000 || Anderson Mesa || LONEOS || — || align=right | 2.0 km || 
|-id=515 bgcolor=#E9E9E9
| 123515 ||  || — || November 19, 2000 || Anderson Mesa || LONEOS || — || align=right | 2.7 km || 
|-id=516 bgcolor=#E9E9E9
| 123516 ||  || — || December 3, 2000 || Kitt Peak || Spacewatch || — || align=right | 2.3 km || 
|-id=517 bgcolor=#d6d6d6
| 123517 ||  || — || December 3, 2000 || Kitt Peak || Spacewatch || — || align=right | 4.2 km || 
|-id=518 bgcolor=#E9E9E9
| 123518 ||  || — || December 1, 2000 || Socorro || LINEAR || — || align=right | 3.2 km || 
|-id=519 bgcolor=#E9E9E9
| 123519 ||  || — || December 1, 2000 || Socorro || LINEAR || — || align=right | 3.2 km || 
|-id=520 bgcolor=#E9E9E9
| 123520 ||  || — || December 1, 2000 || Socorro || LINEAR || — || align=right | 4.3 km || 
|-id=521 bgcolor=#E9E9E9
| 123521 ||  || — || December 1, 2000 || Socorro || LINEAR || — || align=right | 4.0 km || 
|-id=522 bgcolor=#E9E9E9
| 123522 ||  || — || December 1, 2000 || Socorro || LINEAR || RAF || align=right | 1.6 km || 
|-id=523 bgcolor=#E9E9E9
| 123523 ||  || — || December 1, 2000 || Socorro || LINEAR || — || align=right | 4.6 km || 
|-id=524 bgcolor=#E9E9E9
| 123524 ||  || — || December 1, 2000 || Socorro || LINEAR || — || align=right | 4.9 km || 
|-id=525 bgcolor=#d6d6d6
| 123525 ||  || — || December 1, 2000 || Socorro || LINEAR || — || align=right | 7.8 km || 
|-id=526 bgcolor=#E9E9E9
| 123526 ||  || — || December 4, 2000 || Socorro || LINEAR || EUN || align=right | 2.8 km || 
|-id=527 bgcolor=#E9E9E9
| 123527 ||  || — || December 4, 2000 || Socorro || LINEAR || — || align=right | 3.7 km || 
|-id=528 bgcolor=#E9E9E9
| 123528 ||  || — || December 4, 2000 || Socorro || LINEAR || — || align=right | 3.1 km || 
|-id=529 bgcolor=#E9E9E9
| 123529 ||  || — || December 4, 2000 || Socorro || LINEAR || — || align=right | 4.0 km || 
|-id=530 bgcolor=#d6d6d6
| 123530 ||  || — || December 4, 2000 || Socorro || LINEAR || — || align=right | 6.5 km || 
|-id=531 bgcolor=#fefefe
| 123531 ||  || — || December 4, 2000 || Socorro || LINEAR || H || align=right | 1.6 km || 
|-id=532 bgcolor=#E9E9E9
| 123532 ||  || — || December 4, 2000 || Bohyunsan || Y.-B. Jeon, B.-C. Lee || — || align=right | 1.9 km || 
|-id=533 bgcolor=#E9E9E9
| 123533 ||  || — || December 1, 2000 || Socorro || LINEAR || — || align=right | 3.2 km || 
|-id=534 bgcolor=#E9E9E9
| 123534 ||  || — || December 1, 2000 || Socorro || LINEAR || — || align=right | 3.9 km || 
|-id=535 bgcolor=#E9E9E9
| 123535 ||  || — || December 1, 2000 || Socorro || LINEAR || EUN || align=right | 2.9 km || 
|-id=536 bgcolor=#E9E9E9
| 123536 ||  || — || December 4, 2000 || Socorro || LINEAR || — || align=right | 5.0 km || 
|-id=537 bgcolor=#E9E9E9
| 123537 ||  || — || December 4, 2000 || Socorro || LINEAR || — || align=right | 3.4 km || 
|-id=538 bgcolor=#E9E9E9
| 123538 ||  || — || December 4, 2000 || Socorro || LINEAR || — || align=right | 3.6 km || 
|-id=539 bgcolor=#d6d6d6
| 123539 ||  || — || December 4, 2000 || Socorro || LINEAR || — || align=right | 7.5 km || 
|-id=540 bgcolor=#E9E9E9
| 123540 ||  || — || December 4, 2000 || Socorro || LINEAR || — || align=right | 4.8 km || 
|-id=541 bgcolor=#E9E9E9
| 123541 ||  || — || December 4, 2000 || Socorro || LINEAR || KON || align=right | 5.3 km || 
|-id=542 bgcolor=#fefefe
| 123542 ||  || — || December 4, 2000 || Socorro || LINEAR || — || align=right | 2.1 km || 
|-id=543 bgcolor=#E9E9E9
| 123543 ||  || — || December 4, 2000 || Socorro || LINEAR || GEF || align=right | 2.0 km || 
|-id=544 bgcolor=#E9E9E9
| 123544 ||  || — || December 4, 2000 || Socorro || LINEAR || — || align=right | 3.0 km || 
|-id=545 bgcolor=#E9E9E9
| 123545 ||  || — || December 4, 2000 || Socorro || LINEAR || GEF || align=right | 2.7 km || 
|-id=546 bgcolor=#E9E9E9
| 123546 ||  || — || December 4, 2000 || Socorro || LINEAR || — || align=right | 5.9 km || 
|-id=547 bgcolor=#E9E9E9
| 123547 ||  || — || December 4, 2000 || Socorro || LINEAR || — || align=right | 5.5 km || 
|-id=548 bgcolor=#d6d6d6
| 123548 ||  || — || December 4, 2000 || Socorro || LINEAR || — || align=right | 6.3 km || 
|-id=549 bgcolor=#E9E9E9
| 123549 ||  || — || December 4, 2000 || Socorro || LINEAR || — || align=right | 4.3 km || 
|-id=550 bgcolor=#E9E9E9
| 123550 ||  || — || December 4, 2000 || Socorro || LINEAR || ADE || align=right | 5.4 km || 
|-id=551 bgcolor=#E9E9E9
| 123551 ||  || — || December 4, 2000 || Socorro || LINEAR || — || align=right | 3.3 km || 
|-id=552 bgcolor=#d6d6d6
| 123552 ||  || — || December 4, 2000 || Socorro || LINEAR || — || align=right | 8.2 km || 
|-id=553 bgcolor=#E9E9E9
| 123553 ||  || — || December 4, 2000 || Socorro || LINEAR || — || align=right | 3.5 km || 
|-id=554 bgcolor=#E9E9E9
| 123554 ||  || — || December 4, 2000 || Socorro || LINEAR || DOR || align=right | 4.5 km || 
|-id=555 bgcolor=#E9E9E9
| 123555 ||  || — || December 4, 2000 || Socorro || LINEAR || — || align=right | 2.8 km || 
|-id=556 bgcolor=#E9E9E9
| 123556 ||  || — || December 4, 2000 || Socorro || LINEAR || — || align=right | 2.5 km || 
|-id=557 bgcolor=#E9E9E9
| 123557 ||  || — || December 4, 2000 || Socorro || LINEAR || DOR || align=right | 5.1 km || 
|-id=558 bgcolor=#d6d6d6
| 123558 ||  || — || December 4, 2000 || Socorro || LINEAR || — || align=right | 11 km || 
|-id=559 bgcolor=#E9E9E9
| 123559 ||  || — || December 4, 2000 || Socorro || LINEAR || — || align=right | 2.2 km || 
|-id=560 bgcolor=#E9E9E9
| 123560 ||  || — || December 4, 2000 || Socorro || LINEAR || ADE || align=right | 6.0 km || 
|-id=561 bgcolor=#d6d6d6
| 123561 ||  || — || December 4, 2000 || Socorro || LINEAR || — || align=right | 5.5 km || 
|-id=562 bgcolor=#d6d6d6
| 123562 ||  || — || December 4, 2000 || Socorro || LINEAR || — || align=right | 8.3 km || 
|-id=563 bgcolor=#d6d6d6
| 123563 ||  || — || December 4, 2000 || Socorro || LINEAR || — || align=right | 6.0 km || 
|-id=564 bgcolor=#d6d6d6
| 123564 ||  || — || December 4, 2000 || Socorro || LINEAR || — || align=right | 4.6 km || 
|-id=565 bgcolor=#E9E9E9
| 123565 ||  || — || December 4, 2000 || Socorro || LINEAR || — || align=right | 2.3 km || 
|-id=566 bgcolor=#E9E9E9
| 123566 ||  || — || December 5, 2000 || Socorro || LINEAR || GER || align=right | 4.2 km || 
|-id=567 bgcolor=#E9E9E9
| 123567 ||  || — || December 5, 2000 || Socorro || LINEAR || — || align=right | 2.7 km || 
|-id=568 bgcolor=#E9E9E9
| 123568 ||  || — || December 5, 2000 || Socorro || LINEAR || EUN || align=right | 3.8 km || 
|-id=569 bgcolor=#E9E9E9
| 123569 ||  || — || December 5, 2000 || Socorro || LINEAR || EUN || align=right | 2.6 km || 
|-id=570 bgcolor=#E9E9E9
| 123570 ||  || — || December 5, 2000 || Socorro || LINEAR || INO || align=right | 2.5 km || 
|-id=571 bgcolor=#E9E9E9
| 123571 ||  || — || December 5, 2000 || Socorro || LINEAR || — || align=right | 3.1 km || 
|-id=572 bgcolor=#E9E9E9
| 123572 ||  || — || December 5, 2000 || Socorro || LINEAR || EUN || align=right | 2.1 km || 
|-id=573 bgcolor=#E9E9E9
| 123573 ||  || — || December 5, 2000 || Socorro || LINEAR || — || align=right | 3.1 km || 
|-id=574 bgcolor=#E9E9E9
| 123574 ||  || — || December 5, 2000 || Socorro || LINEAR || — || align=right | 2.8 km || 
|-id=575 bgcolor=#d6d6d6
| 123575 ||  || — || December 5, 2000 || Socorro || LINEAR || — || align=right | 6.9 km || 
|-id=576 bgcolor=#fefefe
| 123576 ||  || — || December 4, 2000 || Socorro || LINEAR || H || align=right | 1.0 km || 
|-id=577 bgcolor=#E9E9E9
| 123577 ||  || — || December 4, 2000 || Socorro || LINEAR || — || align=right | 2.8 km || 
|-id=578 bgcolor=#E9E9E9
| 123578 ||  || — || December 4, 2000 || Socorro || LINEAR || EUN || align=right | 4.0 km || 
|-id=579 bgcolor=#E9E9E9
| 123579 ||  || — || December 5, 2000 || Socorro || LINEAR || HNS || align=right | 3.2 km || 
|-id=580 bgcolor=#E9E9E9
| 123580 ||  || — || December 5, 2000 || Socorro || LINEAR || — || align=right | 3.0 km || 
|-id=581 bgcolor=#E9E9E9
| 123581 ||  || — || December 5, 2000 || Socorro || LINEAR || — || align=right | 2.7 km || 
|-id=582 bgcolor=#E9E9E9
| 123582 ||  || — || December 5, 2000 || Socorro || LINEAR || MAR || align=right | 3.1 km || 
|-id=583 bgcolor=#E9E9E9
| 123583 ||  || — || December 5, 2000 || Socorro || LINEAR || POS || align=right | 9.7 km || 
|-id=584 bgcolor=#E9E9E9
| 123584 ||  || — || December 5, 2000 || Socorro || LINEAR || — || align=right | 3.9 km || 
|-id=585 bgcolor=#E9E9E9
| 123585 ||  || — || December 5, 2000 || Socorro || LINEAR || EUN || align=right | 2.9 km || 
|-id=586 bgcolor=#E9E9E9
| 123586 ||  || — || December 5, 2000 || Socorro || LINEAR || EUN || align=right | 2.8 km || 
|-id=587 bgcolor=#E9E9E9
| 123587 ||  || — || December 5, 2000 || Socorro || LINEAR || EUN || align=right | 2.7 km || 
|-id=588 bgcolor=#E9E9E9
| 123588 ||  || — || December 5, 2000 || Socorro || LINEAR || — || align=right | 2.7 km || 
|-id=589 bgcolor=#E9E9E9
| 123589 ||  || — || December 6, 2000 || Socorro || LINEAR || — || align=right | 2.4 km || 
|-id=590 bgcolor=#d6d6d6
| 123590 ||  || — || December 15, 2000 || Socorro || LINEAR || — || align=right | 8.2 km || 
|-id=591 bgcolor=#fefefe
| 123591 ||  || — || December 15, 2000 || Socorro || LINEAR || — || align=right | 3.3 km || 
|-id=592 bgcolor=#E9E9E9
| 123592 ||  || — || December 7, 2000 || Socorro || LINEAR || EUN || align=right | 2.8 km || 
|-id=593 bgcolor=#E9E9E9
| 123593 ||  || — || December 15, 2000 || Socorro || LINEAR || — || align=right | 2.4 km || 
|-id=594 bgcolor=#E9E9E9
| 123594 ||  || — || December 4, 2000 || Socorro || LINEAR || — || align=right | 2.4 km || 
|-id=595 bgcolor=#d6d6d6
| 123595 ||  || — || December 5, 2000 || Socorro || LINEAR || BRA || align=right | 2.8 km || 
|-id=596 bgcolor=#E9E9E9
| 123596 ||  || — || December 6, 2000 || Socorro || LINEAR || — || align=right | 2.6 km || 
|-id=597 bgcolor=#FA8072
| 123597 ||  || — || December 19, 2000 || Socorro || LINEAR || H || align=right | 1.6 km || 
|-id=598 bgcolor=#E9E9E9
| 123598 ||  || — || December 18, 2000 || Kitt Peak || Spacewatch || KON || align=right | 4.3 km || 
|-id=599 bgcolor=#fefefe
| 123599 ||  || — || December 20, 2000 || Socorro || LINEAR || H || align=right data-sort-value="0.88" | 880 m || 
|-id=600 bgcolor=#fefefe
| 123600 ||  || — || December 20, 2000 || Socorro || LINEAR || H || align=right | 1.1 km || 
|}

123601–123700 

|-bgcolor=#d6d6d6
| 123601 ||  || — || December 19, 2000 || Socorro || LINEAR || — || align=right | 5.9 km || 
|-id=602 bgcolor=#E9E9E9
| 123602 ||  || — || December 20, 2000 || Socorro || LINEAR || — || align=right | 2.3 km || 
|-id=603 bgcolor=#d6d6d6
| 123603 ||  || — || December 21, 2000 || Socorro || LINEAR || — || align=right | 8.4 km || 
|-id=604 bgcolor=#E9E9E9
| 123604 ||  || — || December 20, 2000 || Socorro || LINEAR || — || align=right | 1.8 km || 
|-id=605 bgcolor=#E9E9E9
| 123605 ||  || — || December 22, 2000 || Socorro || LINEAR || — || align=right | 5.5 km || 
|-id=606 bgcolor=#E9E9E9
| 123606 ||  || — || December 22, 2000 || Ondřejov || P. Kušnirák, P. Pravec || ADE || align=right | 3.8 km || 
|-id=607 bgcolor=#d6d6d6
| 123607 ||  || — || December 21, 2000 || Bergisch Gladbach || W. Bickel || — || align=right | 5.1 km || 
|-id=608 bgcolor=#E9E9E9
| 123608 ||  || — || December 21, 2000 || Kitt Peak || Spacewatch || — || align=right | 2.4 km || 
|-id=609 bgcolor=#d6d6d6
| 123609 ||  || — || December 21, 2000 || Kitt Peak || Spacewatch || — || align=right | 4.2 km || 
|-id=610 bgcolor=#d6d6d6
| 123610 ||  || — || December 22, 2000 || Kitt Peak || Spacewatch || — || align=right | 5.3 km || 
|-id=611 bgcolor=#E9E9E9
| 123611 ||  || — || December 16, 2000 || Uccle || T. Pauwels || — || align=right | 1.8 km || 
|-id=612 bgcolor=#d6d6d6
| 123612 ||  || — || December 22, 2000 || Gnosca || S. Sposetti || HYG || align=right | 6.3 km || 
|-id=613 bgcolor=#E9E9E9
| 123613 ||  || — || December 24, 2000 || Ondřejov || P. Kušnirák, U. Babiaková || — || align=right | 5.2 km || 
|-id=614 bgcolor=#E9E9E9
| 123614 ||  || — || December 20, 2000 || Socorro || LINEAR || JUN || align=right | 2.2 km || 
|-id=615 bgcolor=#E9E9E9
| 123615 ||  || — || December 28, 2000 || Kitt Peak || Spacewatch || — || align=right | 2.1 km || 
|-id=616 bgcolor=#fefefe
| 123616 ||  || — || December 28, 2000 || Kitt Peak || Spacewatch || NYS || align=right data-sort-value="0.81" | 810 m || 
|-id=617 bgcolor=#E9E9E9
| 123617 ||  || — || December 28, 2000 || Kitt Peak || Spacewatch || GEF || align=right | 2.5 km || 
|-id=618 bgcolor=#E9E9E9
| 123618 ||  || — || December 22, 2000 || Socorro || LINEAR || — || align=right | 5.5 km || 
|-id=619 bgcolor=#E9E9E9
| 123619 ||  || — || December 23, 2000 || Socorro || LINEAR || DOR || align=right | 5.0 km || 
|-id=620 bgcolor=#E9E9E9
| 123620 ||  || — || December 28, 2000 || Socorro || LINEAR || — || align=right | 5.0 km || 
|-id=621 bgcolor=#d6d6d6
| 123621 ||  || — || December 30, 2000 || Kitt Peak || Spacewatch || — || align=right | 6.9 km || 
|-id=622 bgcolor=#E9E9E9
| 123622 ||  || — || December 26, 2000 || Haleakala || NEAT || EUN || align=right | 2.7 km || 
|-id=623 bgcolor=#d6d6d6
| 123623 ||  || — || December 30, 2000 || Kitt Peak || Spacewatch || — || align=right | 5.9 km || 
|-id=624 bgcolor=#FA8072
| 123624 ||  || — || December 30, 2000 || Socorro || LINEAR || H || align=right | 1.4 km || 
|-id=625 bgcolor=#E9E9E9
| 123625 ||  || — || December 30, 2000 || Socorro || LINEAR || — || align=right | 3.2 km || 
|-id=626 bgcolor=#d6d6d6
| 123626 ||  || — || December 30, 2000 || Socorro || LINEAR || — || align=right | 5.1 km || 
|-id=627 bgcolor=#d6d6d6
| 123627 ||  || — || December 30, 2000 || Socorro || LINEAR || — || align=right | 6.6 km || 
|-id=628 bgcolor=#d6d6d6
| 123628 ||  || — || December 30, 2000 || Socorro || LINEAR || THM || align=right | 3.6 km || 
|-id=629 bgcolor=#d6d6d6
| 123629 ||  || — || December 30, 2000 || Socorro || LINEAR || EUP || align=right | 3.7 km || 
|-id=630 bgcolor=#E9E9E9
| 123630 ||  || — || December 30, 2000 || Socorro || LINEAR || — || align=right | 5.1 km || 
|-id=631 bgcolor=#E9E9E9
| 123631 ||  || — || December 30, 2000 || Socorro || LINEAR || — || align=right | 5.2 km || 
|-id=632 bgcolor=#E9E9E9
| 123632 ||  || — || December 30, 2000 || Socorro || LINEAR || — || align=right | 2.3 km || 
|-id=633 bgcolor=#E9E9E9
| 123633 ||  || — || December 30, 2000 || Socorro || LINEAR || NEM || align=right | 3.8 km || 
|-id=634 bgcolor=#d6d6d6
| 123634 ||  || — || December 30, 2000 || Socorro || LINEAR || — || align=right | 4.2 km || 
|-id=635 bgcolor=#E9E9E9
| 123635 ||  || — || December 30, 2000 || Socorro || LINEAR || HEN || align=right | 1.9 km || 
|-id=636 bgcolor=#E9E9E9
| 123636 ||  || — || December 30, 2000 || Socorro || LINEAR || — || align=right | 3.0 km || 
|-id=637 bgcolor=#d6d6d6
| 123637 ||  || — || December 30, 2000 || Socorro || LINEAR || THM || align=right | 5.2 km || 
|-id=638 bgcolor=#d6d6d6
| 123638 ||  || — || December 30, 2000 || Socorro || LINEAR || EOS || align=right | 5.0 km || 
|-id=639 bgcolor=#d6d6d6
| 123639 ||  || — || December 30, 2000 || Socorro || LINEAR || — || align=right | 3.6 km || 
|-id=640 bgcolor=#d6d6d6
| 123640 ||  || — || December 30, 2000 || Socorro || LINEAR || URS || align=right | 5.5 km || 
|-id=641 bgcolor=#E9E9E9
| 123641 ||  || — || December 30, 2000 || Socorro || LINEAR || EUN || align=right | 2.7 km || 
|-id=642 bgcolor=#E9E9E9
| 123642 ||  || — || December 30, 2000 || Socorro || LINEAR || — || align=right | 3.8 km || 
|-id=643 bgcolor=#E9E9E9
| 123643 ||  || — || December 30, 2000 || Socorro || LINEAR || DOR || align=right | 4.2 km || 
|-id=644 bgcolor=#d6d6d6
| 123644 ||  || — || December 30, 2000 || Socorro || LINEAR || EOS || align=right | 3.7 km || 
|-id=645 bgcolor=#d6d6d6
| 123645 ||  || — || December 30, 2000 || Socorro || LINEAR || — || align=right | 4.8 km || 
|-id=646 bgcolor=#d6d6d6
| 123646 ||  || — || December 30, 2000 || Socorro || LINEAR || THM || align=right | 5.5 km || 
|-id=647 bgcolor=#E9E9E9
| 123647 Tomáško ||  ||  || December 31, 2000 || Ondřejov || P. Kušnirák, U. Babiaková || NEM || align=right | 3.0 km || 
|-id=648 bgcolor=#fefefe
| 123648 ||  || — || December 22, 2000 || Socorro || LINEAR || H || align=right | 1.3 km || 
|-id=649 bgcolor=#E9E9E9
| 123649 ||  || — || December 30, 2000 || Kitt Peak || Spacewatch || — || align=right | 1.7 km || 
|-id=650 bgcolor=#E9E9E9
| 123650 ||  || — || December 30, 2000 || Socorro || LINEAR || — || align=right | 2.7 km || 
|-id=651 bgcolor=#d6d6d6
| 123651 ||  || — || December 30, 2000 || Socorro || LINEAR || TIR || align=right | 6.2 km || 
|-id=652 bgcolor=#d6d6d6
| 123652 ||  || — || December 30, 2000 || Socorro || LINEAR || THM || align=right | 5.6 km || 
|-id=653 bgcolor=#d6d6d6
| 123653 ||  || — || December 30, 2000 || Socorro || LINEAR || — || align=right | 6.6 km || 
|-id=654 bgcolor=#E9E9E9
| 123654 ||  || — || December 30, 2000 || Socorro || LINEAR || — || align=right | 2.7 km || 
|-id=655 bgcolor=#E9E9E9
| 123655 ||  || — || December 30, 2000 || Socorro || LINEAR || — || align=right | 4.3 km || 
|-id=656 bgcolor=#E9E9E9
| 123656 ||  || — || December 30, 2000 || Socorro || LINEAR || DOR || align=right | 4.8 km || 
|-id=657 bgcolor=#d6d6d6
| 123657 ||  || — || December 30, 2000 || Socorro || LINEAR || KOR || align=right | 2.9 km || 
|-id=658 bgcolor=#d6d6d6
| 123658 ||  || — || December 30, 2000 || Socorro || LINEAR || — || align=right | 4.8 km || 
|-id=659 bgcolor=#E9E9E9
| 123659 ||  || — || December 30, 2000 || Socorro || LINEAR || — || align=right | 2.7 km || 
|-id=660 bgcolor=#d6d6d6
| 123660 ||  || — || December 30, 2000 || Socorro || LINEAR || KOR || align=right | 2.9 km || 
|-id=661 bgcolor=#E9E9E9
| 123661 ||  || — || December 30, 2000 || Socorro || LINEAR || — || align=right | 2.5 km || 
|-id=662 bgcolor=#d6d6d6
| 123662 ||  || — || December 30, 2000 || Socorro || LINEAR || — || align=right | 6.2 km || 
|-id=663 bgcolor=#E9E9E9
| 123663 ||  || — || December 30, 2000 || Socorro || LINEAR || — || align=right | 2.7 km || 
|-id=664 bgcolor=#d6d6d6
| 123664 ||  || — || December 30, 2000 || Socorro || LINEAR || — || align=right | 5.9 km || 
|-id=665 bgcolor=#E9E9E9
| 123665 ||  || — || December 30, 2000 || Socorro || LINEAR || — || align=right | 2.4 km || 
|-id=666 bgcolor=#E9E9E9
| 123666 ||  || — || December 30, 2000 || Socorro || LINEAR || GEF || align=right | 4.7 km || 
|-id=667 bgcolor=#d6d6d6
| 123667 ||  || — || December 30, 2000 || Socorro || LINEAR || — || align=right | 7.3 km || 
|-id=668 bgcolor=#E9E9E9
| 123668 ||  || — || December 30, 2000 || Socorro || LINEAR || MRX || align=right | 2.2 km || 
|-id=669 bgcolor=#E9E9E9
| 123669 ||  || — || December 30, 2000 || Socorro || LINEAR || — || align=right | 4.8 km || 
|-id=670 bgcolor=#E9E9E9
| 123670 ||  || — || December 30, 2000 || Socorro || LINEAR || MAR || align=right | 2.6 km || 
|-id=671 bgcolor=#E9E9E9
| 123671 ||  || — || December 30, 2000 || Socorro || LINEAR || PAE || align=right | 5.2 km || 
|-id=672 bgcolor=#E9E9E9
| 123672 ||  || — || December 30, 2000 || Socorro || LINEAR || — || align=right | 4.9 km || 
|-id=673 bgcolor=#E9E9E9
| 123673 ||  || — || December 30, 2000 || Socorro || LINEAR || AGN || align=right | 2.3 km || 
|-id=674 bgcolor=#E9E9E9
| 123674 ||  || — || December 30, 2000 || Socorro || LINEAR || — || align=right | 5.6 km || 
|-id=675 bgcolor=#d6d6d6
| 123675 ||  || — || December 30, 2000 || Socorro || LINEAR || — || align=right | 6.6 km || 
|-id=676 bgcolor=#E9E9E9
| 123676 ||  || — || December 30, 2000 || Socorro || LINEAR || WIT || align=right | 2.0 km || 
|-id=677 bgcolor=#d6d6d6
| 123677 ||  || — || December 30, 2000 || Socorro || LINEAR || EOS || align=right | 6.9 km || 
|-id=678 bgcolor=#E9E9E9
| 123678 ||  || — || December 30, 2000 || Socorro || LINEAR || HOF || align=right | 6.1 km || 
|-id=679 bgcolor=#E9E9E9
| 123679 ||  || — || December 30, 2000 || Socorro || LINEAR || — || align=right | 3.3 km || 
|-id=680 bgcolor=#d6d6d6
| 123680 ||  || — || December 30, 2000 || Socorro || LINEAR || THM || align=right | 4.8 km || 
|-id=681 bgcolor=#E9E9E9
| 123681 ||  || — || December 30, 2000 || Socorro || LINEAR || BRU || align=right | 5.7 km || 
|-id=682 bgcolor=#E9E9E9
| 123682 ||  || — || December 30, 2000 || Socorro || LINEAR || AGN || align=right | 2.4 km || 
|-id=683 bgcolor=#d6d6d6
| 123683 ||  || — || December 30, 2000 || Socorro || LINEAR || EOS || align=right | 3.8 km || 
|-id=684 bgcolor=#d6d6d6
| 123684 ||  || — || December 30, 2000 || Socorro || LINEAR || EMA || align=right | 6.5 km || 
|-id=685 bgcolor=#d6d6d6
| 123685 ||  || — || December 30, 2000 || Socorro || LINEAR || — || align=right | 6.1 km || 
|-id=686 bgcolor=#d6d6d6
| 123686 ||  || — || December 30, 2000 || Socorro || LINEAR || — || align=right | 5.8 km || 
|-id=687 bgcolor=#fefefe
| 123687 ||  || — || December 30, 2000 || Socorro || LINEAR || H || align=right | 1.1 km || 
|-id=688 bgcolor=#E9E9E9
| 123688 ||  || — || December 30, 2000 || Socorro || LINEAR || HOF || align=right | 6.0 km || 
|-id=689 bgcolor=#d6d6d6
| 123689 ||  || — || December 30, 2000 || Socorro || LINEAR || — || align=right | 7.4 km || 
|-id=690 bgcolor=#d6d6d6
| 123690 ||  || — || December 30, 2000 || Socorro || LINEAR || — || align=right | 4.5 km || 
|-id=691 bgcolor=#E9E9E9
| 123691 ||  || — || December 28, 2000 || Socorro || LINEAR || MAR || align=right | 2.6 km || 
|-id=692 bgcolor=#E9E9E9
| 123692 ||  || — || December 28, 2000 || Socorro || LINEAR || — || align=right | 6.4 km || 
|-id=693 bgcolor=#E9E9E9
| 123693 ||  || — || December 28, 2000 || Socorro || LINEAR || — || align=right | 4.3 km || 
|-id=694 bgcolor=#E9E9E9
| 123694 ||  || — || December 28, 2000 || Socorro || LINEAR || — || align=right | 3.7 km || 
|-id=695 bgcolor=#E9E9E9
| 123695 ||  || — || December 28, 2000 || Socorro || LINEAR || — || align=right | 7.0 km || 
|-id=696 bgcolor=#E9E9E9
| 123696 ||  || — || December 28, 2000 || Socorro || LINEAR || — || align=right | 2.8 km || 
|-id=697 bgcolor=#d6d6d6
| 123697 ||  || — || December 28, 2000 || Socorro || LINEAR || — || align=right | 6.9 km || 
|-id=698 bgcolor=#d6d6d6
| 123698 ||  || — || December 28, 2000 || Socorro || LINEAR || EUP || align=right | 12 km || 
|-id=699 bgcolor=#d6d6d6
| 123699 ||  || — || December 28, 2000 || Socorro || LINEAR || — || align=right | 12 km || 
|-id=700 bgcolor=#d6d6d6
| 123700 ||  || — || December 30, 2000 || Socorro || LINEAR || — || align=right | 7.0 km || 
|}

123701–123800 

|-bgcolor=#E9E9E9
| 123701 ||  || — || December 30, 2000 || Socorro || LINEAR || — || align=right | 6.0 km || 
|-id=702 bgcolor=#d6d6d6
| 123702 ||  || — || December 30, 2000 || Socorro || LINEAR || — || align=right | 5.5 km || 
|-id=703 bgcolor=#d6d6d6
| 123703 ||  || — || December 30, 2000 || Socorro || LINEAR || — || align=right | 4.8 km || 
|-id=704 bgcolor=#d6d6d6
| 123704 ||  || — || December 30, 2000 || Socorro || LINEAR || — || align=right | 4.5 km || 
|-id=705 bgcolor=#E9E9E9
| 123705 ||  || — || December 30, 2000 || Socorro || LINEAR || — || align=right | 2.9 km || 
|-id=706 bgcolor=#d6d6d6
| 123706 ||  || — || December 30, 2000 || Socorro || LINEAR || KOR || align=right | 2.6 km || 
|-id=707 bgcolor=#d6d6d6
| 123707 ||  || — || December 30, 2000 || Socorro || LINEAR || HYG || align=right | 5.6 km || 
|-id=708 bgcolor=#E9E9E9
| 123708 ||  || — || December 30, 2000 || Socorro || LINEAR || — || align=right | 3.1 km || 
|-id=709 bgcolor=#d6d6d6
| 123709 ||  || — || December 27, 2000 || Anderson Mesa || LONEOS || — || align=right | 5.5 km || 
|-id=710 bgcolor=#d6d6d6
| 123710 ||  || — || December 19, 2000 || Socorro || LINEAR || — || align=right | 8.6 km || 
|-id=711 bgcolor=#E9E9E9
| 123711 ||  || — || December 21, 2000 || Socorro || LINEAR || EUN || align=right | 2.3 km || 
|-id=712 bgcolor=#E9E9E9
| 123712 ||  || — || December 28, 2000 || Socorro || LINEAR || — || align=right | 2.1 km || 
|-id=713 bgcolor=#E9E9E9
| 123713 ||  || — || December 28, 2000 || Socorro || LINEAR || — || align=right | 4.5 km || 
|-id=714 bgcolor=#d6d6d6
| 123714 ||  || — || December 29, 2000 || Anderson Mesa || LONEOS || EMA || align=right | 7.5 km || 
|-id=715 bgcolor=#E9E9E9
| 123715 ||  || — || December 29, 2000 || Anderson Mesa || LONEOS || MAR || align=right | 2.5 km || 
|-id=716 bgcolor=#d6d6d6
| 123716 ||  || — || December 29, 2000 || Anderson Mesa || LONEOS || — || align=right | 6.2 km || 
|-id=717 bgcolor=#E9E9E9
| 123717 ||  || — || December 29, 2000 || Anderson Mesa || LONEOS || — || align=right | 2.8 km || 
|-id=718 bgcolor=#E9E9E9
| 123718 ||  || — || December 29, 2000 || Haleakala || NEAT || — || align=right | 3.4 km || 
|-id=719 bgcolor=#d6d6d6
| 123719 ||  || — || December 30, 2000 || Socorro || LINEAR || — || align=right | 7.7 km || 
|-id=720 bgcolor=#E9E9E9
| 123720 ||  || — || December 31, 2000 || Kitt Peak || Spacewatch || HOF || align=right | 5.1 km || 
|-id=721 bgcolor=#E9E9E9
| 123721 ||  || — || December 31, 2000 || Haleakala || NEAT || GAL || align=right | 3.3 km || 
|-id=722 bgcolor=#E9E9E9
| 123722 ||  || — || December 16, 2000 || Anderson Mesa || LONEOS || — || align=right | 3.0 km || 
|-id=723 bgcolor=#E9E9E9
| 123723 ||  || — || December 17, 2000 || Anderson Mesa || LONEOS || — || align=right | 2.4 km || 
|-id=724 bgcolor=#d6d6d6
| 123724 ||  || — || December 17, 2000 || Socorro || LINEAR || — || align=right | 5.7 km || 
|-id=725 bgcolor=#E9E9E9
| 123725 ||  || — || December 21, 2000 || Socorro || LINEAR || HNA || align=right | 4.4 km || 
|-id=726 bgcolor=#E9E9E9
| 123726 ||  || — || December 23, 2000 || Anderson Mesa || LONEOS || — || align=right | 4.9 km || 
|-id=727 bgcolor=#d6d6d6
| 123727 ||  || — || December 23, 2000 || Socorro || LINEAR || — || align=right | 11 km || 
|-id=728 bgcolor=#d6d6d6
| 123728 ||  || — || December 17, 2000 || Socorro || LINEAR || — || align=right | 5.2 km || 
|-id=729 bgcolor=#d6d6d6
| 123729 ||  || — || January 2, 2001 || Socorro || LINEAR || — || align=right | 3.7 km || 
|-id=730 bgcolor=#d6d6d6
| 123730 ||  || — || January 2, 2001 || Socorro || LINEAR || — || align=right | 5.8 km || 
|-id=731 bgcolor=#d6d6d6
| 123731 ||  || — || January 2, 2001 || Socorro || LINEAR || — || align=right | 5.8 km || 
|-id=732 bgcolor=#d6d6d6
| 123732 ||  || — || January 2, 2001 || Socorro || LINEAR || EOS || align=right | 4.1 km || 
|-id=733 bgcolor=#E9E9E9
| 123733 ||  || — || January 2, 2001 || Socorro || LINEAR || — || align=right | 3.7 km || 
|-id=734 bgcolor=#d6d6d6
| 123734 ||  || — || January 2, 2001 || Socorro || LINEAR || — || align=right | 6.0 km || 
|-id=735 bgcolor=#d6d6d6
| 123735 ||  || — || January 2, 2001 || Socorro || LINEAR || — || align=right | 6.5 km || 
|-id=736 bgcolor=#d6d6d6
| 123736 ||  || — || January 2, 2001 || Socorro || LINEAR || — || align=right | 5.1 km || 
|-id=737 bgcolor=#d6d6d6
| 123737 ||  || — || January 2, 2001 || Socorro || LINEAR || — || align=right | 7.1 km || 
|-id=738 bgcolor=#E9E9E9
| 123738 ||  || — || January 2, 2001 || Socorro || LINEAR || — || align=right | 2.9 km || 
|-id=739 bgcolor=#d6d6d6
| 123739 ||  || — || January 2, 2001 || Socorro || LINEAR || — || align=right | 7.3 km || 
|-id=740 bgcolor=#d6d6d6
| 123740 ||  || — || January 2, 2001 || Socorro || LINEAR || HYG || align=right | 7.7 km || 
|-id=741 bgcolor=#E9E9E9
| 123741 ||  || — || January 4, 2001 || Bohyunsan || Y.-B. Jeon, B.-C. Lee || MIS || align=right | 3.7 km || 
|-id=742 bgcolor=#E9E9E9
| 123742 ||  || — || January 3, 2001 || Socorro || LINEAR || ADE || align=right | 4.5 km || 
|-id=743 bgcolor=#E9E9E9
| 123743 ||  || — || January 3, 2001 || Socorro || LINEAR || — || align=right | 4.3 km || 
|-id=744 bgcolor=#d6d6d6
| 123744 ||  || — || January 3, 2001 || Socorro || LINEAR || — || align=right | 4.8 km || 
|-id=745 bgcolor=#d6d6d6
| 123745 ||  || — || January 3, 2001 || Socorro || LINEAR || — || align=right | 5.3 km || 
|-id=746 bgcolor=#d6d6d6
| 123746 ||  || — || January 3, 2001 || Socorro || LINEAR || — || align=right | 5.4 km || 
|-id=747 bgcolor=#fefefe
| 123747 ||  || — || January 4, 2001 || Fair Oaks Ranch || J. V. McClusky || H || align=right data-sort-value="0.99" | 990 m || 
|-id=748 bgcolor=#E9E9E9
| 123748 ||  || — || January 5, 2001 || Socorro || LINEAR || — || align=right | 2.3 km || 
|-id=749 bgcolor=#d6d6d6
| 123749 ||  || — || January 5, 2001 || Socorro || LINEAR || NAE || align=right | 5.8 km || 
|-id=750 bgcolor=#E9E9E9
| 123750 ||  || — || January 5, 2001 || Socorro || LINEAR || RAF || align=right | 3.0 km || 
|-id=751 bgcolor=#E9E9E9
| 123751 ||  || — || January 5, 2001 || Socorro || LINEAR || GEF || align=right | 2.6 km || 
|-id=752 bgcolor=#E9E9E9
| 123752 ||  || — || January 5, 2001 || Socorro || LINEAR || — || align=right | 4.5 km || 
|-id=753 bgcolor=#E9E9E9
| 123753 ||  || — || January 4, 2001 || Socorro || LINEAR || GEF || align=right | 3.1 km || 
|-id=754 bgcolor=#E9E9E9
| 123754 ||  || — || January 4, 2001 || Socorro || LINEAR || slow || align=right | 3.7 km || 
|-id=755 bgcolor=#E9E9E9
| 123755 ||  || — || January 4, 2001 || Socorro || LINEAR || JUN || align=right | 2.8 km || 
|-id=756 bgcolor=#E9E9E9
| 123756 ||  || — || January 5, 2001 || Socorro || LINEAR || INO || align=right | 2.1 km || 
|-id=757 bgcolor=#E9E9E9
| 123757 ||  || — || January 5, 2001 || Socorro || LINEAR || — || align=right | 4.7 km || 
|-id=758 bgcolor=#d6d6d6
| 123758 ||  || — || January 3, 2001 || Anderson Mesa || LONEOS || — || align=right | 5.2 km || 
|-id=759 bgcolor=#fefefe
| 123759 ||  || — || January 3, 2001 || Anderson Mesa || LONEOS || H || align=right data-sort-value="0.89" | 890 m || 
|-id=760 bgcolor=#fefefe
| 123760 ||  || — || January 3, 2001 || Anderson Mesa || LONEOS || H || align=right | 1.0 km || 
|-id=761 bgcolor=#E9E9E9
| 123761 ||  || — || January 3, 2001 || Socorro || LINEAR || — || align=right | 2.4 km || 
|-id=762 bgcolor=#fefefe
| 123762 ||  || — || January 3, 2001 || Socorro || LINEAR || H || align=right | 1.3 km || 
|-id=763 bgcolor=#fefefe
| 123763 ||  || — || January 3, 2001 || Anderson Mesa || LONEOS || H || align=right | 1.8 km || 
|-id=764 bgcolor=#E9E9E9
| 123764 ||  || — || January 14, 2001 || Kitt Peak || Spacewatch || AGN || align=right | 2.4 km || 
|-id=765 bgcolor=#fefefe
| 123765 ||  || — || January 15, 2001 || Socorro || LINEAR || H || align=right | 1.1 km || 
|-id=766 bgcolor=#d6d6d6
| 123766 ||  || — || January 15, 2001 || Bergisch Gladbach || W. Bickel || — || align=right | 3.7 km || 
|-id=767 bgcolor=#fefefe
| 123767 ||  || — || January 4, 2001 || Socorro || LINEAR || H || align=right | 1.4 km || 
|-id=768 bgcolor=#d6d6d6
| 123768 ||  || — || January 14, 2001 || Kitt Peak || Spacewatch || — || align=right | 3.7 km || 
|-id=769 bgcolor=#d6d6d6
| 123769 ||  || — || January 15, 2001 || Kitt Peak || Spacewatch || CHA || align=right | 2.6 km || 
|-id=770 bgcolor=#E9E9E9
| 123770 ||  || — || January 4, 2001 || Kitt Peak || Spacewatch || — || align=right | 4.6 km || 
|-id=771 bgcolor=#E9E9E9
| 123771 || 2001 BL || — || January 17, 2001 || Oizumi || T. Kobayashi || AGN || align=right | 2.5 km || 
|-id=772 bgcolor=#E9E9E9
| 123772 ||  || — || January 17, 2001 || Socorro || LINEAR || — || align=right | 3.0 km || 
|-id=773 bgcolor=#d6d6d6
| 123773 ||  || — || January 18, 2001 || Socorro || LINEAR || — || align=right | 9.4 km || 
|-id=774 bgcolor=#d6d6d6
| 123774 ||  || — || January 19, 2001 || Socorro || LINEAR || HYG || align=right | 5.3 km || 
|-id=775 bgcolor=#E9E9E9
| 123775 ||  || — || January 19, 2001 || Socorro || LINEAR || — || align=right | 4.0 km || 
|-id=776 bgcolor=#E9E9E9
| 123776 ||  || — || January 19, 2001 || Socorro || LINEAR || — || align=right | 2.7 km || 
|-id=777 bgcolor=#d6d6d6
| 123777 ||  || — || January 19, 2001 || Socorro || LINEAR || — || align=right | 6.6 km || 
|-id=778 bgcolor=#E9E9E9
| 123778 ||  || — || January 19, 2001 || Kitt Peak || Spacewatch || — || align=right | 2.2 km || 
|-id=779 bgcolor=#d6d6d6
| 123779 ||  || — || January 18, 2001 || Socorro || LINEAR || — || align=right | 8.4 km || 
|-id=780 bgcolor=#E9E9E9
| 123780 ||  || — || January 21, 2001 || Socorro || LINEAR || AGN || align=right | 1.8 km || 
|-id=781 bgcolor=#d6d6d6
| 123781 ||  || — || January 21, 2001 || Oizumi || T. Kobayashi || EOS || align=right | 3.6 km || 
|-id=782 bgcolor=#d6d6d6
| 123782 ||  || — || January 21, 2001 || Oizumi || T. Kobayashi || EUP || align=right | 8.8 km || 
|-id=783 bgcolor=#d6d6d6
| 123783 ||  || — || January 18, 2001 || Socorro || LINEAR || BRA || align=right | 2.9 km || 
|-id=784 bgcolor=#E9E9E9
| 123784 ||  || — || January 19, 2001 || Socorro || LINEAR || — || align=right | 5.5 km || 
|-id=785 bgcolor=#E9E9E9
| 123785 ||  || — || January 19, 2001 || Socorro || LINEAR || — || align=right | 2.8 km || 
|-id=786 bgcolor=#d6d6d6
| 123786 ||  || — || January 19, 2001 || Socorro || LINEAR || — || align=right | 5.6 km || 
|-id=787 bgcolor=#E9E9E9
| 123787 ||  || — || January 20, 2001 || Socorro || LINEAR || — || align=right | 2.9 km || 
|-id=788 bgcolor=#E9E9E9
| 123788 ||  || — || January 20, 2001 || Socorro || LINEAR || — || align=right | 2.2 km || 
|-id=789 bgcolor=#E9E9E9
| 123789 ||  || — || January 20, 2001 || Socorro || LINEAR || — || align=right | 4.6 km || 
|-id=790 bgcolor=#d6d6d6
| 123790 ||  || — || January 20, 2001 || Socorro || LINEAR || — || align=right | 5.4 km || 
|-id=791 bgcolor=#d6d6d6
| 123791 ||  || — || January 20, 2001 || Socorro || LINEAR || — || align=right | 5.5 km || 
|-id=792 bgcolor=#d6d6d6
| 123792 ||  || — || January 21, 2001 || Socorro || LINEAR || KOR || align=right | 2.8 km || 
|-id=793 bgcolor=#d6d6d6
| 123793 ||  || — || January 19, 2001 || Kitt Peak || Spacewatch || KOR || align=right | 2.8 km || 
|-id=794 bgcolor=#E9E9E9
| 123794 Deadwood ||  ||  || January 25, 2001 || Badlands || R. Dyvig || — || align=right | 4.1 km || 
|-id=795 bgcolor=#E9E9E9
| 123795 ||  || — || January 25, 2001 || Badlands || R. Dyvig || — || align=right | 4.2 km || 
|-id=796 bgcolor=#d6d6d6
| 123796 ||  || — || January 19, 2001 || Socorro || LINEAR || EUP || align=right | 7.4 km || 
|-id=797 bgcolor=#d6d6d6
| 123797 ||  || — || January 19, 2001 || Socorro || LINEAR || EOS || align=right | 3.5 km || 
|-id=798 bgcolor=#d6d6d6
| 123798 ||  || — || January 21, 2001 || Socorro || LINEAR || EMA || align=right | 6.3 km || 
|-id=799 bgcolor=#d6d6d6
| 123799 ||  || — || January 21, 2001 || Socorro || LINEAR || 7:4 || align=right | 11 km || 
|-id=800 bgcolor=#d6d6d6
| 123800 ||  || — || January 21, 2001 || Socorro || LINEAR || MEL || align=right | 6.3 km || 
|}

123801–123900 

|-bgcolor=#d6d6d6
| 123801 ||  || — || January 18, 2001 || Kitt Peak || Spacewatch || — || align=right | 6.9 km || 
|-id=802 bgcolor=#E9E9E9
| 123802 ||  || — || January 19, 2001 || Socorro || LINEAR || — || align=right | 2.9 km || 
|-id=803 bgcolor=#d6d6d6
| 123803 ||  || — || January 19, 2001 || Socorro || LINEAR || — || align=right | 6.2 km || 
|-id=804 bgcolor=#E9E9E9
| 123804 ||  || — || January 26, 2001 || Socorro || LINEAR || — || align=right | 5.5 km || 
|-id=805 bgcolor=#fefefe
| 123805 ||  || — || January 26, 2001 || Socorro || LINEAR || H || align=right | 1.9 km || 
|-id=806 bgcolor=#E9E9E9
| 123806 ||  || — || January 29, 2001 || Socorro || LINEAR || — || align=right | 2.7 km || 
|-id=807 bgcolor=#E9E9E9
| 123807 ||  || — || January 29, 2001 || Socorro || LINEAR || — || align=right | 4.8 km || 
|-id=808 bgcolor=#d6d6d6
| 123808 ||  || — || January 29, 2001 || Socorro || LINEAR || ALA || align=right | 7.1 km || 
|-id=809 bgcolor=#d6d6d6
| 123809 ||  || — || January 31, 2001 || Haleakala || NEAT || — || align=right | 6.3 km || 
|-id=810 bgcolor=#d6d6d6
| 123810 ||  || — || January 26, 2001 || Socorro || LINEAR || — || align=right | 7.0 km || 
|-id=811 bgcolor=#d6d6d6
| 123811 ||  || — || January 30, 2001 || Socorro || LINEAR || — || align=right | 6.4 km || 
|-id=812 bgcolor=#d6d6d6
| 123812 ||  || — || January 30, 2001 || Socorro || LINEAR || — || align=right | 7.7 km || 
|-id=813 bgcolor=#d6d6d6
| 123813 ||  || — || January 31, 2001 || Socorro || LINEAR || — || align=right | 7.5 km || 
|-id=814 bgcolor=#d6d6d6
| 123814 ||  || — || January 29, 2001 || Socorro || LINEAR || — || align=right | 6.0 km || 
|-id=815 bgcolor=#d6d6d6
| 123815 ||  || — || January 31, 2001 || Socorro || LINEAR || — || align=right | 3.9 km || 
|-id=816 bgcolor=#E9E9E9
| 123816 ||  || — || January 29, 2001 || Kvistaberg || UDAS || PAD || align=right | 4.5 km || 
|-id=817 bgcolor=#d6d6d6
| 123817 ||  || — || January 31, 2001 || Kitt Peak || Spacewatch || — || align=right | 4.1 km || 
|-id=818 bgcolor=#d6d6d6
| 123818 Helenzier ||  ||  || January 31, 2001 || Junk Bond || D. Healy || KOR || align=right | 2.6 km || 
|-id=819 bgcolor=#d6d6d6
| 123819 ||  || — || January 25, 2001 || Kitt Peak || Spacewatch || — || align=right | 5.4 km || 
|-id=820 bgcolor=#d6d6d6
| 123820 ||  || — || January 21, 2001 || Socorro || LINEAR || EOS || align=right | 4.1 km || 
|-id=821 bgcolor=#E9E9E9
| 123821 ||  || — || January 20, 2001 || Socorro || LINEAR || — || align=right | 4.2 km || 
|-id=822 bgcolor=#d6d6d6
| 123822 ||  || — || January 19, 2001 || Haleakala || NEAT || URS || align=right | 6.2 km || 
|-id=823 bgcolor=#E9E9E9
| 123823 ||  || — || January 19, 2001 || Kitt Peak || Spacewatch || — || align=right | 4.4 km || 
|-id=824 bgcolor=#d6d6d6
| 123824 ||  || — || February 1, 2001 || Socorro || LINEAR || — || align=right | 8.2 km || 
|-id=825 bgcolor=#E9E9E9
| 123825 ||  || — || February 1, 2001 || Socorro || LINEAR || DOR || align=right | 7.1 km || 
|-id=826 bgcolor=#d6d6d6
| 123826 ||  || — || February 1, 2001 || Socorro || LINEAR || — || align=right | 5.3 km || 
|-id=827 bgcolor=#d6d6d6
| 123827 ||  || — || February 1, 2001 || Socorro || LINEAR || URS || align=right | 8.1 km || 
|-id=828 bgcolor=#d6d6d6
| 123828 ||  || — || February 1, 2001 || Socorro || LINEAR || EOS || align=right | 4.5 km || 
|-id=829 bgcolor=#E9E9E9
| 123829 ||  || — || February 1, 2001 || Socorro || LINEAR || — || align=right | 3.7 km || 
|-id=830 bgcolor=#d6d6d6
| 123830 ||  || — || February 1, 2001 || Socorro || LINEAR || EOS || align=right | 4.2 km || 
|-id=831 bgcolor=#d6d6d6
| 123831 ||  || — || February 1, 2001 || Socorro || LINEAR || — || align=right | 5.9 km || 
|-id=832 bgcolor=#d6d6d6
| 123832 ||  || — || February 1, 2001 || Socorro || LINEAR || HYG || align=right | 4.6 km || 
|-id=833 bgcolor=#d6d6d6
| 123833 ||  || — || February 1, 2001 || Socorro || LINEAR || — || align=right | 6.1 km || 
|-id=834 bgcolor=#d6d6d6
| 123834 ||  || — || February 1, 2001 || Socorro || LINEAR || — || align=right | 6.2 km || 
|-id=835 bgcolor=#d6d6d6
| 123835 ||  || — || February 1, 2001 || Socorro || LINEAR || — || align=right | 4.9 km || 
|-id=836 bgcolor=#d6d6d6
| 123836 ||  || — || February 2, 2001 || Socorro || LINEAR || EOS || align=right | 4.3 km || 
|-id=837 bgcolor=#fefefe
| 123837 ||  || — || February 3, 2001 || Socorro || LINEAR || H || align=right | 1.3 km || 
|-id=838 bgcolor=#d6d6d6
| 123838 ||  || — || February 4, 2001 || Socorro || LINEAR || — || align=right | 7.5 km || 
|-id=839 bgcolor=#d6d6d6
| 123839 ||  || — || February 1, 2001 || Anderson Mesa || LONEOS || — || align=right | 6.6 km || 
|-id=840 bgcolor=#d6d6d6
| 123840 ||  || — || February 1, 2001 || Anderson Mesa || LONEOS || HYG || align=right | 5.3 km || 
|-id=841 bgcolor=#d6d6d6
| 123841 ||  || — || February 1, 2001 || Anderson Mesa || LONEOS || — || align=right | 5.9 km || 
|-id=842 bgcolor=#d6d6d6
| 123842 ||  || — || February 2, 2001 || Anderson Mesa || LONEOS || EUP || align=right | 5.9 km || 
|-id=843 bgcolor=#d6d6d6
| 123843 ||  || — || February 2, 2001 || Anderson Mesa || LONEOS || — || align=right | 7.4 km || 
|-id=844 bgcolor=#d6d6d6
| 123844 ||  || — || February 2, 2001 || Anderson Mesa || LONEOS || — || align=right | 5.1 km || 
|-id=845 bgcolor=#d6d6d6
| 123845 ||  || — || February 2, 2001 || Anderson Mesa || LONEOS || — || align=right | 5.0 km || 
|-id=846 bgcolor=#fefefe
| 123846 ||  || — || February 4, 2001 || Socorro || LINEAR || H || align=right | 1.3 km || 
|-id=847 bgcolor=#d6d6d6
| 123847 ||  || — || February 5, 2001 || Socorro || LINEAR || — || align=right | 5.3 km || 
|-id=848 bgcolor=#d6d6d6
| 123848 ||  || — || February 13, 2001 || Socorro || LINEAR || — || align=right | 5.1 km || 
|-id=849 bgcolor=#fefefe
| 123849 ||  || — || February 13, 2001 || Socorro || LINEAR || H || align=right | 1.7 km || 
|-id=850 bgcolor=#d6d6d6
| 123850 ||  || — || February 13, 2001 || Kitt Peak || Spacewatch || ALA || align=right | 5.1 km || 
|-id=851 bgcolor=#E9E9E9
| 123851 ||  || — || February 14, 2001 || Ondřejov || L. Kotková || — || align=right | 4.4 km || 
|-id=852 bgcolor=#d6d6d6
| 123852 Jánboďa ||  ||  || February 15, 2001 || Modra || Š. Gajdoš, A. Galád || — || align=right | 4.6 km || 
|-id=853 bgcolor=#d6d6d6
| 123853 ||  || — || February 15, 2001 || Socorro || LINEAR || ALA || align=right | 6.2 km || 
|-id=854 bgcolor=#E9E9E9
| 123854 ||  || — || February 15, 2001 || Socorro || LINEAR || — || align=right | 3.4 km || 
|-id=855 bgcolor=#d6d6d6
| 123855 ||  || — || February 15, 2001 || Socorro || LINEAR || Tj (2.98) || align=right | 11 km || 
|-id=856 bgcolor=#d6d6d6
| 123856 ||  || — || February 13, 2001 || Socorro || LINEAR || — || align=right | 6.5 km || 
|-id=857 bgcolor=#d6d6d6
| 123857 ||  || — || February 15, 2001 || Socorro || LINEAR || — || align=right | 8.6 km || 
|-id=858 bgcolor=#d6d6d6
| 123858 ||  || — || February 13, 2001 || Kitt Peak || Spacewatch || — || align=right | 5.1 km || 
|-id=859 bgcolor=#d6d6d6
| 123859 ||  || — || February 11, 2001 || Cima Ekar || ADAS || — || align=right | 7.4 km || 
|-id=860 bgcolor=#d6d6d6
| 123860 Davederrick || 2001 DX ||  || February 16, 2001 || Nogales || M. Schwartz, P. R. Holvorcem || EMA || align=right | 8.8 km || 
|-id=861 bgcolor=#d6d6d6
| 123861 ||  || — || February 16, 2001 || Kitt Peak || Spacewatch || — || align=right | 4.4 km || 
|-id=862 bgcolor=#fefefe
| 123862 ||  || — || February 16, 2001 || Socorro || LINEAR || H || align=right | 1.1 km || 
|-id=863 bgcolor=#d6d6d6
| 123863 ||  || — || February 16, 2001 || Socorro || LINEAR || EOS || align=right | 3.9 km || 
|-id=864 bgcolor=#E9E9E9
| 123864 ||  || — || February 16, 2001 || Črni Vrh || Črni Vrh || — || align=right | 5.4 km || 
|-id=865 bgcolor=#d6d6d6
| 123865 ||  || — || February 16, 2001 || Oizumi || T. Kobayashi || HYG || align=right | 6.9 km || 
|-id=866 bgcolor=#d6d6d6
| 123866 ||  || — || February 16, 2001 || Socorro || LINEAR || EOS || align=right | 3.4 km || 
|-id=867 bgcolor=#E9E9E9
| 123867 ||  || — || February 17, 2001 || Socorro || LINEAR || — || align=right | 2.7 km || 
|-id=868 bgcolor=#d6d6d6
| 123868 ||  || — || February 19, 2001 || Oizumi || T. Kobayashi || — || align=right | 8.2 km || 
|-id=869 bgcolor=#d6d6d6
| 123869 ||  || — || February 19, 2001 || Oizumi || T. Kobayashi || HYG || align=right | 7.3 km || 
|-id=870 bgcolor=#d6d6d6
| 123870 ||  || — || February 16, 2001 || Socorro || LINEAR || YAK || align=right | 5.1 km || 
|-id=871 bgcolor=#d6d6d6
| 123871 ||  || — || February 16, 2001 || Socorro || LINEAR || ALA || align=right | 7.1 km || 
|-id=872 bgcolor=#d6d6d6
| 123872 ||  || — || February 17, 2001 || Socorro || LINEAR || LAU || align=right | 1.7 km || 
|-id=873 bgcolor=#E9E9E9
| 123873 ||  || — || February 17, 2001 || Socorro || LINEAR || — || align=right | 3.9 km || 
|-id=874 bgcolor=#d6d6d6
| 123874 ||  || — || February 17, 2001 || Socorro || LINEAR || — || align=right | 5.0 km || 
|-id=875 bgcolor=#d6d6d6
| 123875 ||  || — || February 17, 2001 || Socorro || LINEAR || HYG || align=right | 5.4 km || 
|-id=876 bgcolor=#d6d6d6
| 123876 ||  || — || February 17, 2001 || Socorro || LINEAR || EOS || align=right | 4.4 km || 
|-id=877 bgcolor=#d6d6d6
| 123877 ||  || — || February 17, 2001 || Socorro || LINEAR || — || align=right | 5.7 km || 
|-id=878 bgcolor=#d6d6d6
| 123878 ||  || — || February 17, 2001 || Socorro || LINEAR || — || align=right | 6.0 km || 
|-id=879 bgcolor=#E9E9E9
| 123879 ||  || — || February 19, 2001 || Socorro || LINEAR || — || align=right | 5.5 km || 
|-id=880 bgcolor=#E9E9E9
| 123880 ||  || — || February 19, 2001 || Socorro || LINEAR || — || align=right | 4.2 km || 
|-id=881 bgcolor=#d6d6d6
| 123881 ||  || — || February 19, 2001 || Socorro || LINEAR || YAK || align=right | 6.3 km || 
|-id=882 bgcolor=#d6d6d6
| 123882 ||  || — || February 19, 2001 || Socorro || LINEAR || — || align=right | 5.2 km || 
|-id=883 bgcolor=#d6d6d6
| 123883 ||  || — || February 19, 2001 || Socorro || LINEAR || — || align=right | 4.7 km || 
|-id=884 bgcolor=#d6d6d6
| 123884 ||  || — || February 19, 2001 || Socorro || LINEAR || EOS || align=right | 4.1 km || 
|-id=885 bgcolor=#d6d6d6
| 123885 ||  || — || February 19, 2001 || Socorro || LINEAR || KOR || align=right | 2.9 km || 
|-id=886 bgcolor=#d6d6d6
| 123886 ||  || — || February 19, 2001 || Socorro || LINEAR || — || align=right | 6.9 km || 
|-id=887 bgcolor=#d6d6d6
| 123887 ||  || — || February 19, 2001 || Socorro || LINEAR || — || align=right | 5.0 km || 
|-id=888 bgcolor=#d6d6d6
| 123888 ||  || — || February 16, 2001 || Socorro || LINEAR || VER || align=right | 5.3 km || 
|-id=889 bgcolor=#d6d6d6
| 123889 ||  || — || February 16, 2001 || Socorro || LINEAR || EOS || align=right | 3.8 km || 
|-id=890 bgcolor=#E9E9E9
| 123890 ||  || — || February 16, 2001 || Socorro || LINEAR || — || align=right | 2.9 km || 
|-id=891 bgcolor=#E9E9E9
| 123891 ||  || — || February 16, 2001 || Socorro || LINEAR || — || align=right | 3.0 km || 
|-id=892 bgcolor=#d6d6d6
| 123892 ||  || — || February 16, 2001 || Socorro || LINEAR || — || align=right | 6.4 km || 
|-id=893 bgcolor=#E9E9E9
| 123893 ||  || — || February 17, 2001 || Socorro || LINEAR || DOR || align=right | 4.7 km || 
|-id=894 bgcolor=#d6d6d6
| 123894 ||  || — || February 20, 2001 || Socorro || LINEAR || — || align=right | 5.7 km || 
|-id=895 bgcolor=#E9E9E9
| 123895 ||  || — || February 16, 2001 || Kitt Peak || Spacewatch || HOF || align=right | 5.1 km || 
|-id=896 bgcolor=#fefefe
| 123896 ||  || — || February 21, 2001 || Socorro || LINEAR || H || align=right | 1.1 km || 
|-id=897 bgcolor=#E9E9E9
| 123897 ||  || — || February 19, 2001 || Socorro || LINEAR || HOF || align=right | 3.8 km || 
|-id=898 bgcolor=#E9E9E9
| 123898 ||  || — || February 19, 2001 || Socorro || LINEAR || DOR || align=right | 6.5 km || 
|-id=899 bgcolor=#d6d6d6
| 123899 ||  || — || February 19, 2001 || Socorro || LINEAR || HYG || align=right | 6.2 km || 
|-id=900 bgcolor=#d6d6d6
| 123900 ||  || — || February 19, 2001 || Socorro || LINEAR || EOS || align=right | 4.3 km || 
|}

123901–124000 

|-bgcolor=#d6d6d6
| 123901 ||  || — || February 19, 2001 || Socorro || LINEAR || — || align=right | 5.1 km || 
|-id=902 bgcolor=#d6d6d6
| 123902 ||  || — || February 19, 2001 || Socorro || LINEAR || — || align=right | 4.8 km || 
|-id=903 bgcolor=#d6d6d6
| 123903 ||  || — || February 19, 2001 || Socorro || LINEAR || — || align=right | 5.7 km || 
|-id=904 bgcolor=#d6d6d6
| 123904 ||  || — || February 20, 2001 || Socorro || LINEAR || — || align=right | 4.3 km || 
|-id=905 bgcolor=#d6d6d6
| 123905 ||  || — || February 20, 2001 || Socorro || LINEAR || — || align=right | 6.0 km || 
|-id=906 bgcolor=#d6d6d6
| 123906 ||  || — || February 21, 2001 || Socorro || LINEAR || EOS || align=right | 3.8 km || 
|-id=907 bgcolor=#d6d6d6
| 123907 ||  || — || February 22, 2001 || Kitt Peak || Spacewatch || — || align=right | 4.9 km || 
|-id=908 bgcolor=#d6d6d6
| 123908 ||  || — || February 19, 2001 || Haleakala || NEAT || — || align=right | 6.1 km || 
|-id=909 bgcolor=#d6d6d6
| 123909 ||  || — || February 23, 2001 || Kitt Peak || Spacewatch || — || align=right | 3.6 km || 
|-id=910 bgcolor=#d6d6d6
| 123910 ||  || — || February 27, 2001 || Kitt Peak || Spacewatch || — || align=right | 6.1 km || 
|-id=911 bgcolor=#d6d6d6
| 123911 ||  || — || February 27, 2001 || Kitt Peak || Spacewatch || EOS || align=right | 3.2 km || 
|-id=912 bgcolor=#d6d6d6
| 123912 ||  || — || February 20, 2001 || Socorro || LINEAR || — || align=right | 4.5 km || 
|-id=913 bgcolor=#d6d6d6
| 123913 ||  || — || February 19, 2001 || Socorro || LINEAR || HYG || align=right | 4.9 km || 
|-id=914 bgcolor=#d6d6d6
| 123914 ||  || — || February 19, 2001 || Socorro || LINEAR || ALA || align=right | 7.3 km || 
|-id=915 bgcolor=#d6d6d6
| 123915 ||  || — || February 18, 2001 || Haleakala || NEAT || LIX || align=right | 9.4 km || 
|-id=916 bgcolor=#d6d6d6
| 123916 ||  || — || February 17, 2001 || Socorro || LINEAR || — || align=right | 4.7 km || 
|-id=917 bgcolor=#d6d6d6
| 123917 ||  || — || February 17, 2001 || Socorro || LINEAR || — || align=right | 8.2 km || 
|-id=918 bgcolor=#d6d6d6
| 123918 ||  || — || February 17, 2001 || Haleakala || NEAT || — || align=right | 7.1 km || 
|-id=919 bgcolor=#d6d6d6
| 123919 ||  || — || February 17, 2001 || Socorro || LINEAR || EOS || align=right | 4.3 km || 
|-id=920 bgcolor=#FA8072
| 123920 ||  || — || February 17, 2001 || Socorro || LINEAR || H || align=right | 2.3 km || 
|-id=921 bgcolor=#d6d6d6
| 123921 ||  || — || February 16, 2001 || Anderson Mesa || LONEOS || EOS || align=right | 3.2 km || 
|-id=922 bgcolor=#d6d6d6
| 123922 ||  || — || February 22, 2001 || Socorro || LINEAR || — || align=right | 5.2 km || 
|-id=923 bgcolor=#d6d6d6
| 123923 ||  || — || February 27, 2001 || Cima Ekar || ADAS || — || align=right | 8.8 km || 
|-id=924 bgcolor=#d6d6d6
| 123924 ||  || — || March 1, 2001 || Socorro || LINEAR || — || align=right | 5.9 km || 
|-id=925 bgcolor=#d6d6d6
| 123925 ||  || — || March 1, 2001 || Socorro || LINEAR || URS || align=right | 8.0 km || 
|-id=926 bgcolor=#d6d6d6
| 123926 ||  || — || March 3, 2001 || Kitt Peak || Spacewatch || THM || align=right | 3.8 km || 
|-id=927 bgcolor=#d6d6d6
| 123927 ||  || — || March 2, 2001 || Anderson Mesa || LONEOS || — || align=right | 5.3 km || 
|-id=928 bgcolor=#E9E9E9
| 123928 ||  || — || March 2, 2001 || Anderson Mesa || LONEOS || — || align=right | 5.1 km || 
|-id=929 bgcolor=#d6d6d6
| 123929 ||  || — || March 2, 2001 || Anderson Mesa || LONEOS || AEG || align=right | 5.1 km || 
|-id=930 bgcolor=#d6d6d6
| 123930 ||  || — || March 2, 2001 || Anderson Mesa || LONEOS || — || align=right | 8.0 km || 
|-id=931 bgcolor=#d6d6d6
| 123931 ||  || — || March 2, 2001 || Anderson Mesa || LONEOS || EOS || align=right | 4.5 km || 
|-id=932 bgcolor=#d6d6d6
| 123932 ||  || — || March 3, 2001 || Socorro || LINEAR || — || align=right | 4.4 km || 
|-id=933 bgcolor=#E9E9E9
| 123933 ||  || — || March 15, 2001 || Socorro || LINEAR || — || align=right | 6.5 km || 
|-id=934 bgcolor=#d6d6d6
| 123934 ||  || — || March 15, 2001 || Socorro || LINEAR || — || align=right | 6.7 km || 
|-id=935 bgcolor=#d6d6d6
| 123935 ||  || — || March 15, 2001 || Socorro || LINEAR || URS || align=right | 7.8 km || 
|-id=936 bgcolor=#d6d6d6
| 123936 ||  || — || March 15, 2001 || Socorro || LINEAR || — || align=right | 5.0 km || 
|-id=937 bgcolor=#fefefe
| 123937 ||  || — || March 3, 2001 || Socorro || LINEAR || H || align=right | 2.2 km || 
|-id=938 bgcolor=#fefefe
| 123938 ||  || — || March 13, 2001 || Socorro || LINEAR || H || align=right | 1.7 km || 
|-id=939 bgcolor=#d6d6d6
| 123939 ||  || — || March 15, 2001 || Socorro || LINEAR || EUP || align=right | 7.1 km || 
|-id=940 bgcolor=#d6d6d6
| 123940 ||  || — || March 15, 2001 || Haleakala || NEAT || — || align=right | 6.9 km || 
|-id=941 bgcolor=#d6d6d6
| 123941 ||  || — || March 13, 2001 || Anderson Mesa || LONEOS || TIR || align=right | 7.0 km || 
|-id=942 bgcolor=#E9E9E9
| 123942 ||  || — || March 14, 2001 || Anderson Mesa || LONEOS || EUN || align=right | 2.6 km || 
|-id=943 bgcolor=#d6d6d6
| 123943 ||  || — || March 15, 2001 || Kitt Peak || Spacewatch || — || align=right | 4.6 km || 
|-id=944 bgcolor=#d6d6d6
| 123944 ||  || — || March 15, 2001 || Anderson Mesa || LONEOS || — || align=right | 6.9 km || 
|-id=945 bgcolor=#d6d6d6
| 123945 ||  || — || March 15, 2001 || Anderson Mesa || LONEOS || HYG || align=right | 6.1 km || 
|-id=946 bgcolor=#d6d6d6
| 123946 ||  || — || March 15, 2001 || Haleakala || NEAT || — || align=right | 6.2 km || 
|-id=947 bgcolor=#fefefe
| 123947 ||  || — || March 3, 2001 || Socorro || LINEAR || H || align=right | 1.2 km || 
|-id=948 bgcolor=#d6d6d6
| 123948 ||  || — || March 15, 2001 || Haleakala || NEAT || — || align=right | 3.5 km || 
|-id=949 bgcolor=#d6d6d6
| 123949 ||  || — || March 2, 2001 || Anderson Mesa || LONEOS || EOS || align=right | 4.0 km || 
|-id=950 bgcolor=#d6d6d6
| 123950 ||  || — || March 18, 2001 || Socorro || LINEAR || — || align=right | 5.2 km || 
|-id=951 bgcolor=#d6d6d6
| 123951 ||  || — || March 18, 2001 || Oizumi || T. Kobayashi || — || align=right | 4.9 km || 
|-id=952 bgcolor=#fefefe
| 123952 ||  || — || March 18, 2001 || Socorro || LINEAR || H || align=right | 1.1 km || 
|-id=953 bgcolor=#d6d6d6
| 123953 ||  || — || March 20, 2001 || Kitt Peak || Spacewatch || — || align=right | 4.5 km || 
|-id=954 bgcolor=#fefefe
| 123954 ||  || — || March 18, 2001 || Socorro || LINEAR || H || align=right | 1.1 km || 
|-id=955 bgcolor=#d6d6d6
| 123955 ||  || — || March 17, 2001 || Gnosca || S. Sposetti || — || align=right | 4.5 km || 
|-id=956 bgcolor=#d6d6d6
| 123956 ||  || — || March 19, 2001 || Anderson Mesa || LONEOS || EOS || align=right | 4.4 km || 
|-id=957 bgcolor=#d6d6d6
| 123957 ||  || — || March 19, 2001 || Anderson Mesa || LONEOS || EOS || align=right | 4.5 km || 
|-id=958 bgcolor=#fefefe
| 123958 ||  || — || March 19, 2001 || Anderson Mesa || LONEOS || H || align=right | 1.0 km || 
|-id=959 bgcolor=#d6d6d6
| 123959 ||  || — || March 19, 2001 || Anderson Mesa || LONEOS || — || align=right | 7.2 km || 
|-id=960 bgcolor=#d6d6d6
| 123960 ||  || — || March 19, 2001 || Anderson Mesa || LONEOS || THM || align=right | 4.6 km || 
|-id=961 bgcolor=#d6d6d6
| 123961 ||  || — || March 19, 2001 || Anderson Mesa || LONEOS || HYG || align=right | 7.8 km || 
|-id=962 bgcolor=#d6d6d6
| 123962 ||  || — || March 19, 2001 || Anderson Mesa || LONEOS || — || align=right | 5.2 km || 
|-id=963 bgcolor=#d6d6d6
| 123963 ||  || — || March 19, 2001 || Anderson Mesa || LONEOS || — || align=right | 4.2 km || 
|-id=964 bgcolor=#d6d6d6
| 123964 ||  || — || March 19, 2001 || Anderson Mesa || LONEOS || THM || align=right | 5.5 km || 
|-id=965 bgcolor=#d6d6d6
| 123965 ||  || — || March 19, 2001 || Anderson Mesa || LONEOS || KOR || align=right | 2.8 km || 
|-id=966 bgcolor=#d6d6d6
| 123966 ||  || — || March 21, 2001 || Anderson Mesa || LONEOS || — || align=right | 6.9 km || 
|-id=967 bgcolor=#d6d6d6
| 123967 ||  || — || March 21, 2001 || Anderson Mesa || LONEOS || — || align=right | 4.3 km || 
|-id=968 bgcolor=#d6d6d6
| 123968 ||  || — || March 18, 2001 || Socorro || LINEAR || EOS || align=right | 4.0 km || 
|-id=969 bgcolor=#d6d6d6
| 123969 ||  || — || March 18, 2001 || Socorro || LINEAR || — || align=right | 4.9 km || 
|-id=970 bgcolor=#d6d6d6
| 123970 ||  || — || March 18, 2001 || Socorro || LINEAR || — || align=right | 8.5 km || 
|-id=971 bgcolor=#d6d6d6
| 123971 ||  || — || March 19, 2001 || Socorro || LINEAR || — || align=right | 6.2 km || 
|-id=972 bgcolor=#d6d6d6
| 123972 ||  || — || March 19, 2001 || Socorro || LINEAR || — || align=right | 5.7 km || 
|-id=973 bgcolor=#d6d6d6
| 123973 ||  || — || March 19, 2001 || Socorro || LINEAR || — || align=right | 5.3 km || 
|-id=974 bgcolor=#d6d6d6
| 123974 ||  || — || March 19, 2001 || Socorro || LINEAR || HYG || align=right | 6.8 km || 
|-id=975 bgcolor=#d6d6d6
| 123975 ||  || — || March 21, 2001 || Haleakala || NEAT || — || align=right | 6.7 km || 
|-id=976 bgcolor=#d6d6d6
| 123976 ||  || — || March 18, 2001 || Socorro || LINEAR || — || align=right | 4.8 km || 
|-id=977 bgcolor=#E9E9E9
| 123977 ||  || — || March 18, 2001 || Socorro || LINEAR || — || align=right | 4.0 km || 
|-id=978 bgcolor=#d6d6d6
| 123978 ||  || — || March 18, 2001 || Socorro || LINEAR || — || align=right | 5.1 km || 
|-id=979 bgcolor=#d6d6d6
| 123979 ||  || — || March 18, 2001 || Socorro || LINEAR || LIX || align=right | 8.6 km || 
|-id=980 bgcolor=#d6d6d6
| 123980 ||  || — || March 18, 2001 || Socorro || LINEAR || — || align=right | 3.9 km || 
|-id=981 bgcolor=#d6d6d6
| 123981 ||  || — || March 18, 2001 || Socorro || LINEAR || — || align=right | 4.3 km || 
|-id=982 bgcolor=#d6d6d6
| 123982 ||  || — || March 18, 2001 || Socorro || LINEAR || YAK || align=right | 7.7 km || 
|-id=983 bgcolor=#d6d6d6
| 123983 ||  || — || March 18, 2001 || Socorro || LINEAR || — || align=right | 5.1 km || 
|-id=984 bgcolor=#d6d6d6
| 123984 ||  || — || March 18, 2001 || Socorro || LINEAR || — || align=right | 8.4 km || 
|-id=985 bgcolor=#d6d6d6
| 123985 ||  || — || March 18, 2001 || Socorro || LINEAR || — || align=right | 5.5 km || 
|-id=986 bgcolor=#d6d6d6
| 123986 ||  || — || March 23, 2001 || Socorro || LINEAR || — || align=right | 4.9 km || 
|-id=987 bgcolor=#d6d6d6
| 123987 ||  || — || March 24, 2001 || Haleakala || NEAT || — || align=right | 8.2 km || 
|-id=988 bgcolor=#d6d6d6
| 123988 ||  || — || March 19, 2001 || Socorro || LINEAR || EOS || align=right | 3.7 km || 
|-id=989 bgcolor=#d6d6d6
| 123989 ||  || — || March 19, 2001 || Socorro || LINEAR || EOS || align=right | 5.5 km || 
|-id=990 bgcolor=#d6d6d6
| 123990 ||  || — || March 19, 2001 || Socorro || LINEAR || — || align=right | 5.6 km || 
|-id=991 bgcolor=#d6d6d6
| 123991 ||  || — || March 19, 2001 || Socorro || LINEAR || — || align=right | 7.3 km || 
|-id=992 bgcolor=#d6d6d6
| 123992 ||  || — || March 19, 2001 || Socorro || LINEAR || — || align=right | 4.8 km || 
|-id=993 bgcolor=#d6d6d6
| 123993 ||  || — || March 19, 2001 || Socorro || LINEAR || — || align=right | 9.0 km || 
|-id=994 bgcolor=#d6d6d6
| 123994 ||  || — || March 19, 2001 || Socorro || LINEAR || — || align=right | 6.0 km || 
|-id=995 bgcolor=#d6d6d6
| 123995 ||  || — || March 19, 2001 || Socorro || LINEAR || — || align=right | 4.8 km || 
|-id=996 bgcolor=#d6d6d6
| 123996 ||  || — || March 19, 2001 || Socorro || LINEAR || EOS || align=right | 4.5 km || 
|-id=997 bgcolor=#d6d6d6
| 123997 ||  || — || March 19, 2001 || Socorro || LINEAR || BRA || align=right | 3.8 km || 
|-id=998 bgcolor=#d6d6d6
| 123998 ||  || — || March 19, 2001 || Socorro || LINEAR || THM || align=right | 5.5 km || 
|-id=999 bgcolor=#E9E9E9
| 123999 ||  || — || March 19, 2001 || Socorro || LINEAR || — || align=right | 2.4 km || 
|-id=000 bgcolor=#d6d6d6
| 124000 ||  || — || March 19, 2001 || Socorro || LINEAR || — || align=right | 5.9 km || 
|}

References

External links 
 Discovery Circumstances: Numbered Minor Planets (120001)–(125000) (IAU Minor Planet Center)

0123